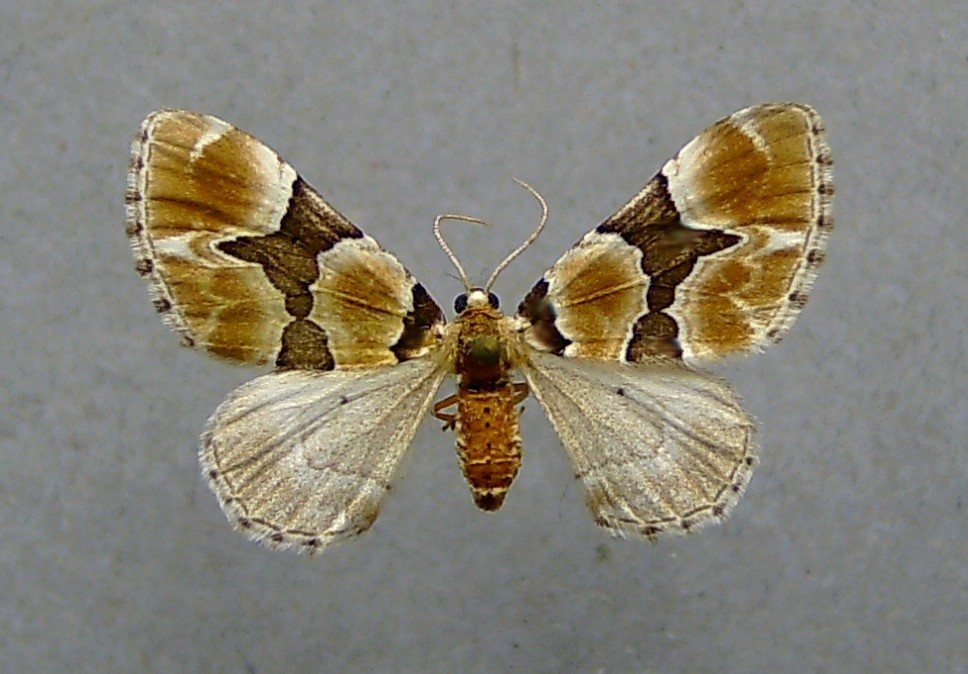

Scientific classification
- Domain: Eukaryota
- Kingdom: Animalia
- Phylum: Arthropoda
- Class: Insecta
- Order: Lepidoptera
- Family: Geometridae
- Genus: Gagitodes
- Species: G. sagittata

Binomial name
- Gagitodes sagittata (Fabricius, 1787)

Synonyms
- Perizoma sagittata (Fabricius, 1787); Perizoma sagittatum (Fabricius, 1787)

= Gagitodes sagittata =

Marsh carpet

Species of moth

Gagitodes sagittata, the marsh carpet, is a moth of the family Geometridae. The species was first described by Johan Christian Fabricius in 1787. It is found in eastern Asia, including Japan, Korea and China and in central and northern Europe. It is sometimes included in the genus Perizoma

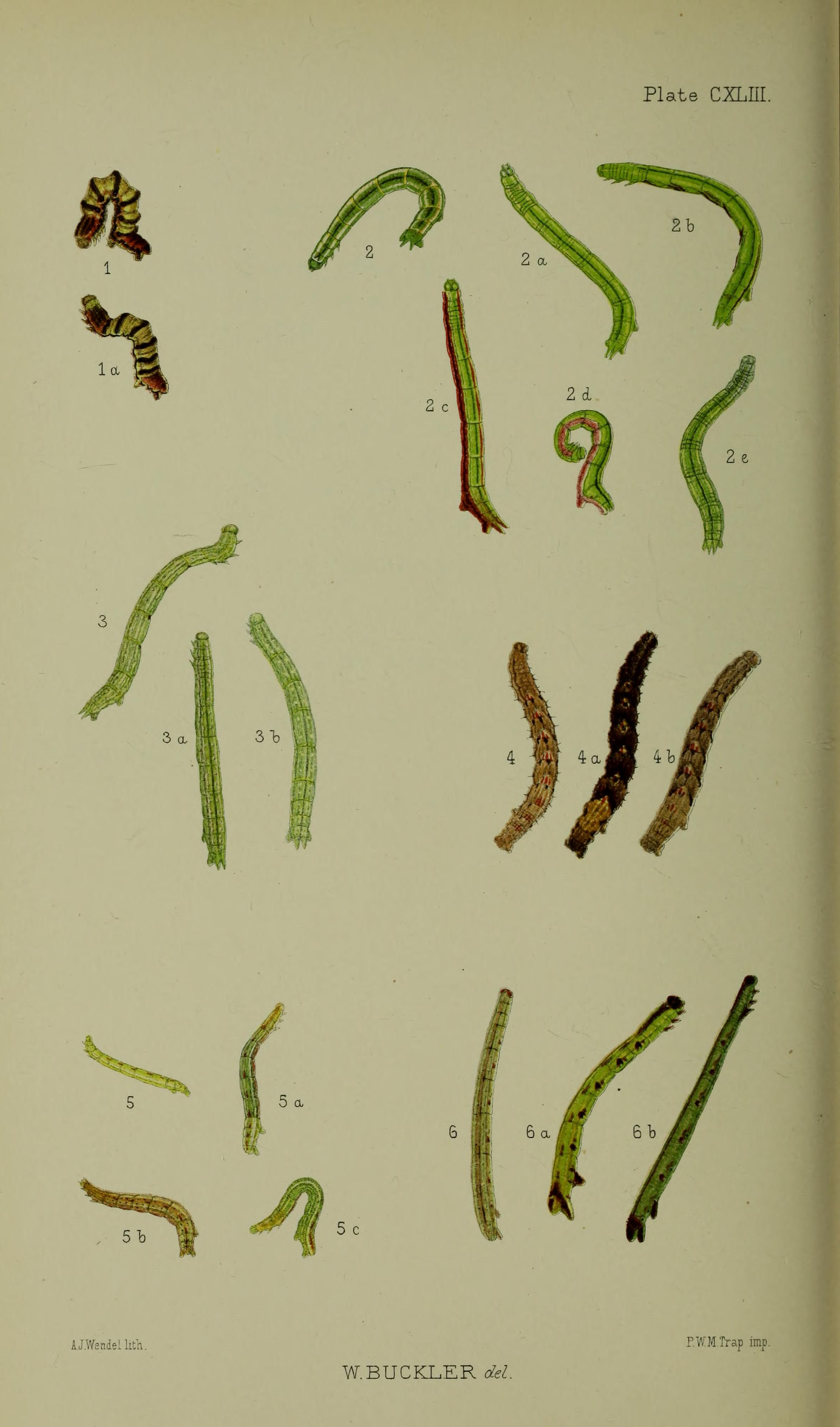
Figs. 1,1a larvae after final moult

The wingspan is 26–34 mm. The moth flies from June to August depending on the location.

The larvae feed on Thalictrum species.
