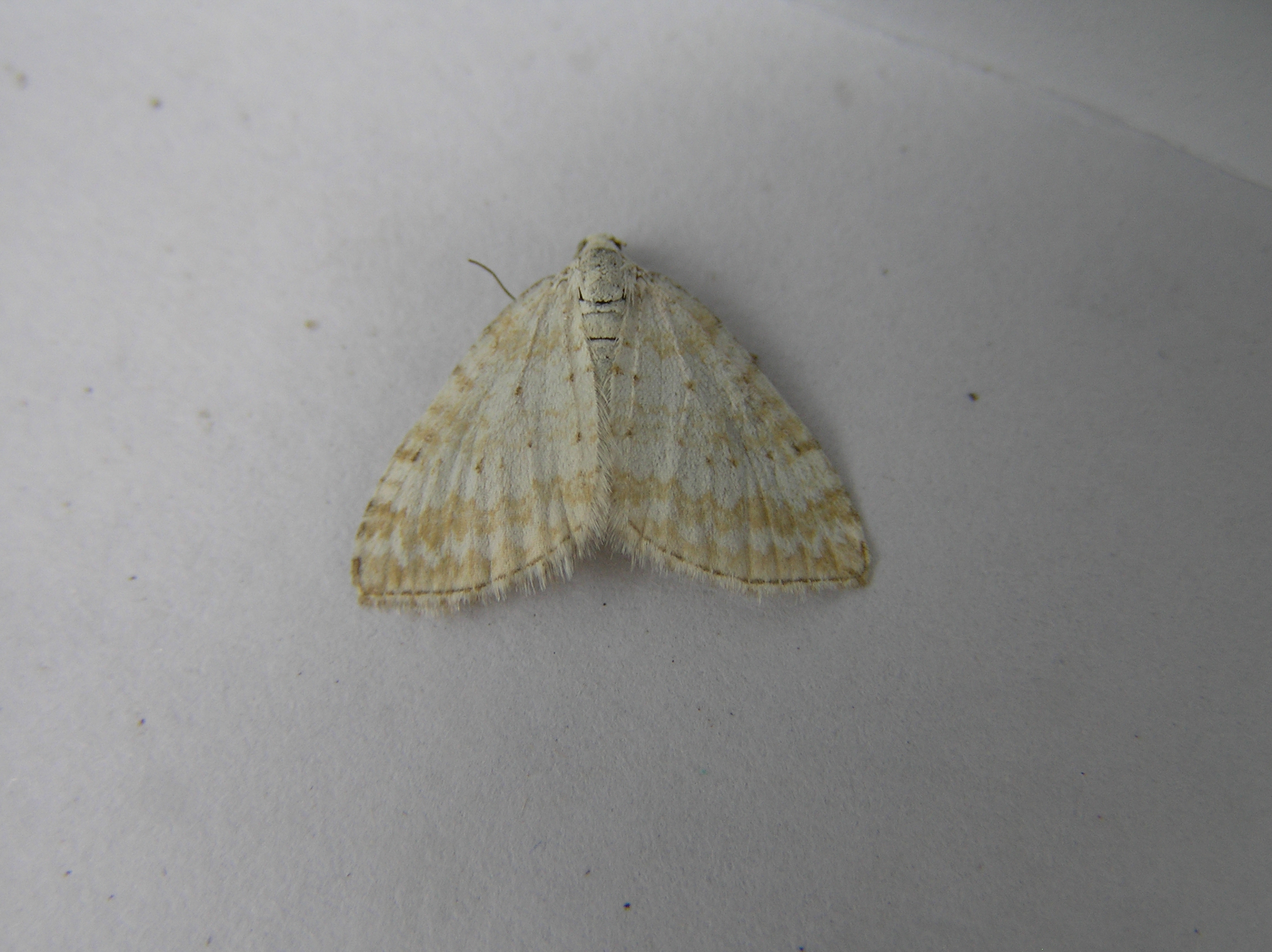
- Grass rivulet Perizoma albulata

Scientific classification
- Domain: Eukaryota
- Kingdom: Animalia
- Phylum: Arthropoda
- Class: Insecta
- Order: Lepidoptera
- Family: Geometridae
- Subfamily: Larentiinae
- Tribe: Perizomini; Herbulot, 1961

= Perizomini =

Tribe of moths

Perizomini is a tribe of geometer moths under subfamily Larentiinae. It was first proposed by Claude Herbulot in 1961. It contains four genera, including the eponymous Perizoma.

== Genera ==
- Martania Mironov, 2000
- Mesotype Hübner, 1825
- Perizoma Hübner, 1825
- Pseudobaptria Inoue, 1982
