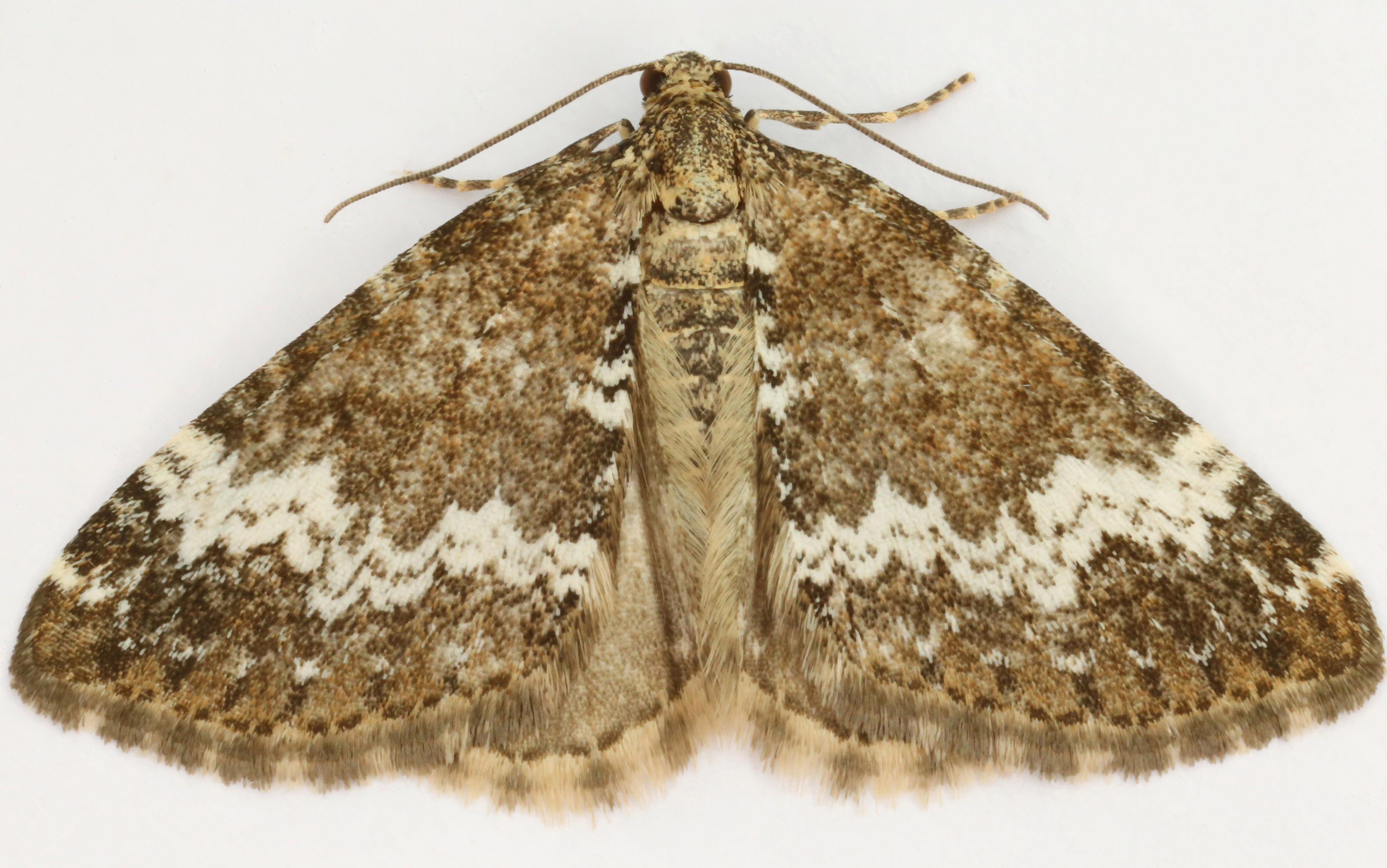
- Perizoma alchemillata Minera, North Wales

Scientific classification
- Kingdom: Animalia
- Phylum: Arthropoda
- Clade: Pancrustacea
- Class: Insecta
- Order: Lepidoptera
- Family: Geometridae
- Genus: Perizoma
- Species: P. alchemillata

Binomial name
- Perizoma alchemillata (Linnaeus, 1758)

= Perizoma alchemillata =

Species of moth

Perizoma alchemillata, the small rivulet, is a moth of the genus Perizoma in the family Geometridae. The species was first described by Carl Linnaeus in his 1758 10th edition of Systema Naturae.

== Distribution ==
It is found in Europe, Asia Minor, Transcaucasia, Siberia and the Altai Mountains.

== Description ==
The species is very similar to Perizoma affinitata in colour and pattern but often has a double indention in the inner margin of the band. It is also smaller. "Very similar to affinitata but smaller, with clearer and more regular white marks at the hindmargin of the forewing, tendency towards obsolescence of the pale band on the dark hindwing; distal area of forewing with black dushes on the veins. Generally less variable than affinitata. — peterseni notn. nov. has the white antemedian band well expressed; generally also the postmedian white band is somewhat widened and sometimes even a complete white subbasal is present. It is the prevailing form in Estonia and perhaps in Scandinavia and is commoner in Scotland than in England, but occurs as an aberration in many localities."

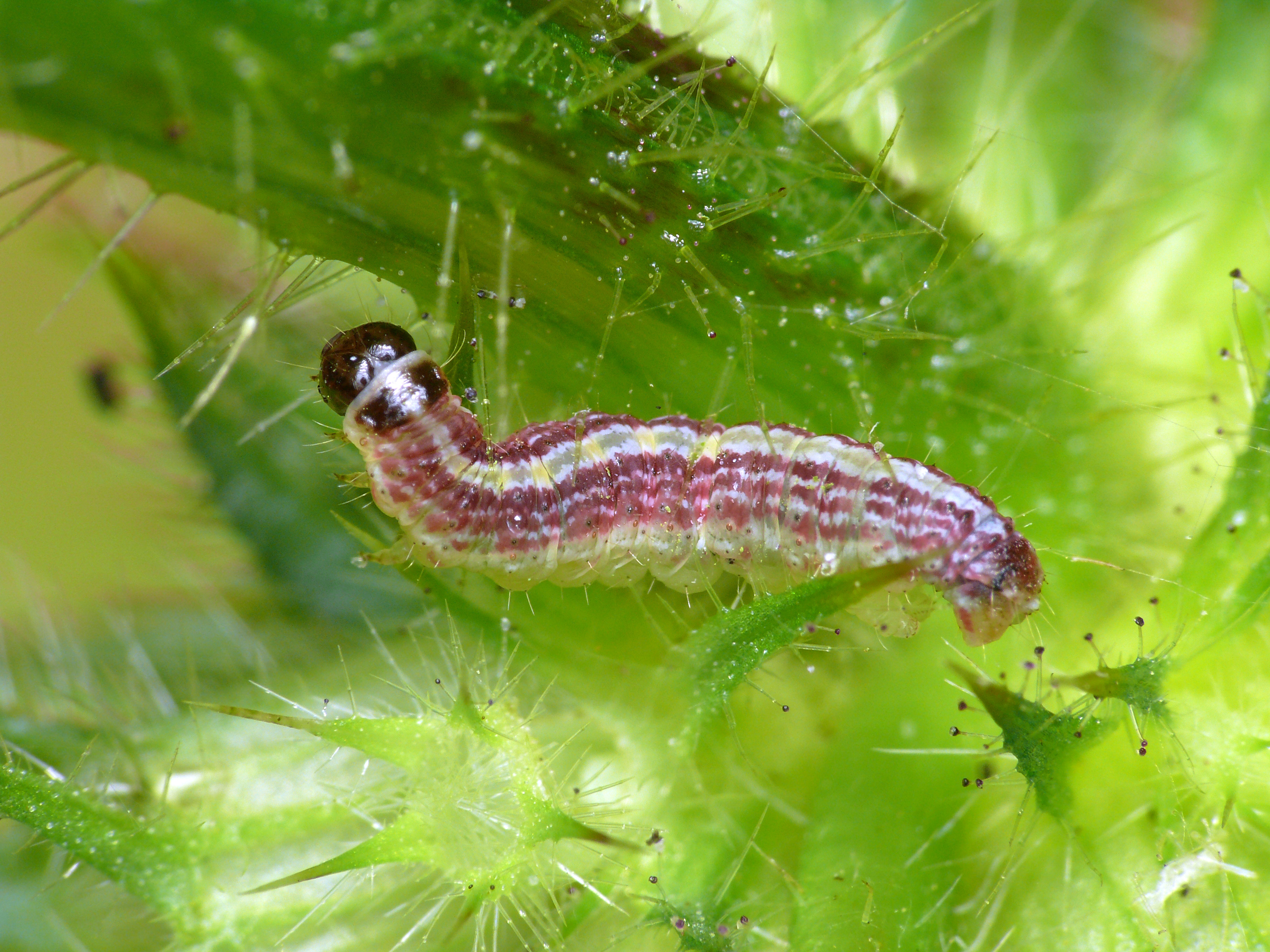
Larva

The larva is short and powerful, with some short bristles. It is light green with two red longitudinal stripes along the back.

== Biology ==
The species lives in forests, but also in open areas. Caterpillars of this species feed inside the seed capsules, and on the flowers of, Galeopsis tetrahit, Lamium purpureum, Galeopsis speciosa.
