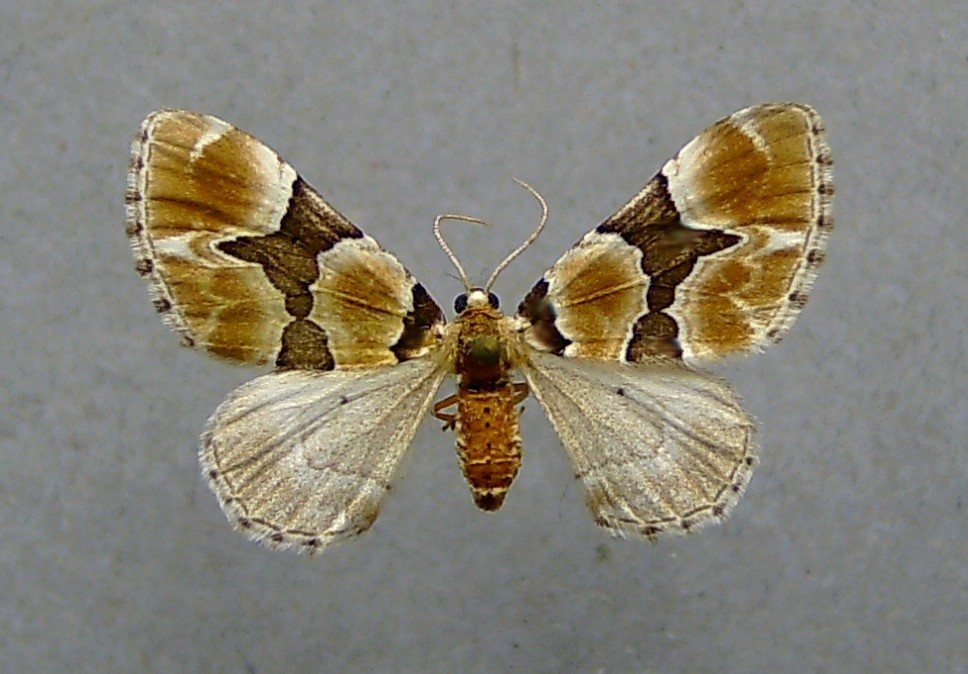
- Gagitodes

Scientific classification
- Domain: Eukaryota
- Kingdom: Animalia
- Phylum: Arthropoda
- Class: Insecta
- Order: Lepidoptera
- Family: Geometridae
- Tribe: Perizomini
- Genus: Gagitodes; Warren, 1893

= Gagitodes =

Genus of moths

Gagitodes is a genus of moths in the family Geometridae described by Warren in 1893. It is considered a synonym of Perizoma by some authors.

== Selected species ==
- Gagitodes omnifasciaria (Inoue, 1998)
- Gagitodes parvaria (Leech, 1891)
- Gagitodes sagittata (Fabricius, 1787) - marsh carpet
