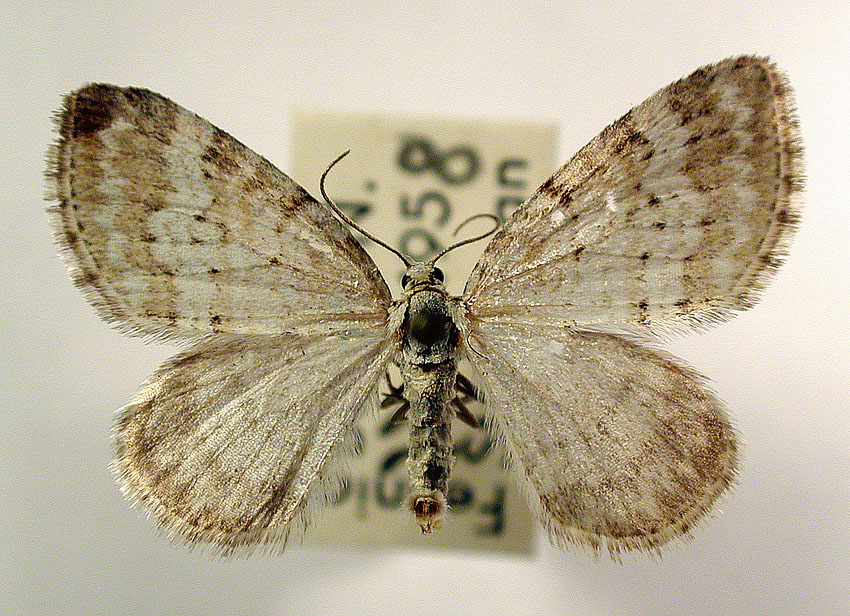

Conservation status
- Endangered (IUCN 3.1)

Scientific classification
- Domain: Eukaryota
- Kingdom: Animalia
- Phylum: Arthropoda
- Class: Insecta
- Order: Lepidoptera
- Family: Geometridae
- Genus: Perizoma
- Species: P. albulata

Binomial name
- Perizoma albulata (Denis & Schiffermüller, 1775)

Synonyms
- Geometra albulata Denis & Schiffermüller, 1775; Perizoma albulatum

= Perizoma albulata =

Grass rivulet

Species of moth

Perizoma albulata, the grass rivulet, is a moth of the genus Perizoma in the family Geometridae. The species was first described by Michael Denis and Ignaz Schiffermüller in 1775.

== Distribution ==
It is found in most of Europe and east to the Urals and Transcaucasia. Further east, it is found in Siberia.

== Description ==
The wingspan is 17–21 mm. "C. albulata Schiff. Related to [C. blandiata and C. minorata], [but] on an average larger, the markings much weaker, brown. In the name-type the ground-colour is white and the markings quite indistinct, light brown or grey-brown, the median band scarcely indicated except by transverse lines. Our English race is less pure white, generally somewhat suffused with greyish or yellowish, but scarcely needs a separate name. - griseaia indicates the more extreme examples of this English race, in which the greyish tone of the markings becomes more pronounced and there is even some admixture of fuscous; the ground-colour remains white, but the hindwing is greyish. - subfasciaria Boh. is a small yellowish-grey or brownish-grey form, in general weakly marked, and occurs in some of the Scandinavian mountains and in Shetland. - ab. thules Weir is merely an extremely darkened aberration of subfasciaria, perhaps found only in Shetland. - dissoluta Strand, from Arctic Norway, is paler than the type, perhaps on an average smaller, but not so small as subfasciaria. It occurs also as an occasional aberration in the Swiss Alps, Bucovina and Roumania. - ab. hebudium Weir is a pure white markingless aberration of exceedingly rare occurrence except in the Hebrides, where it is comparatively frequent."

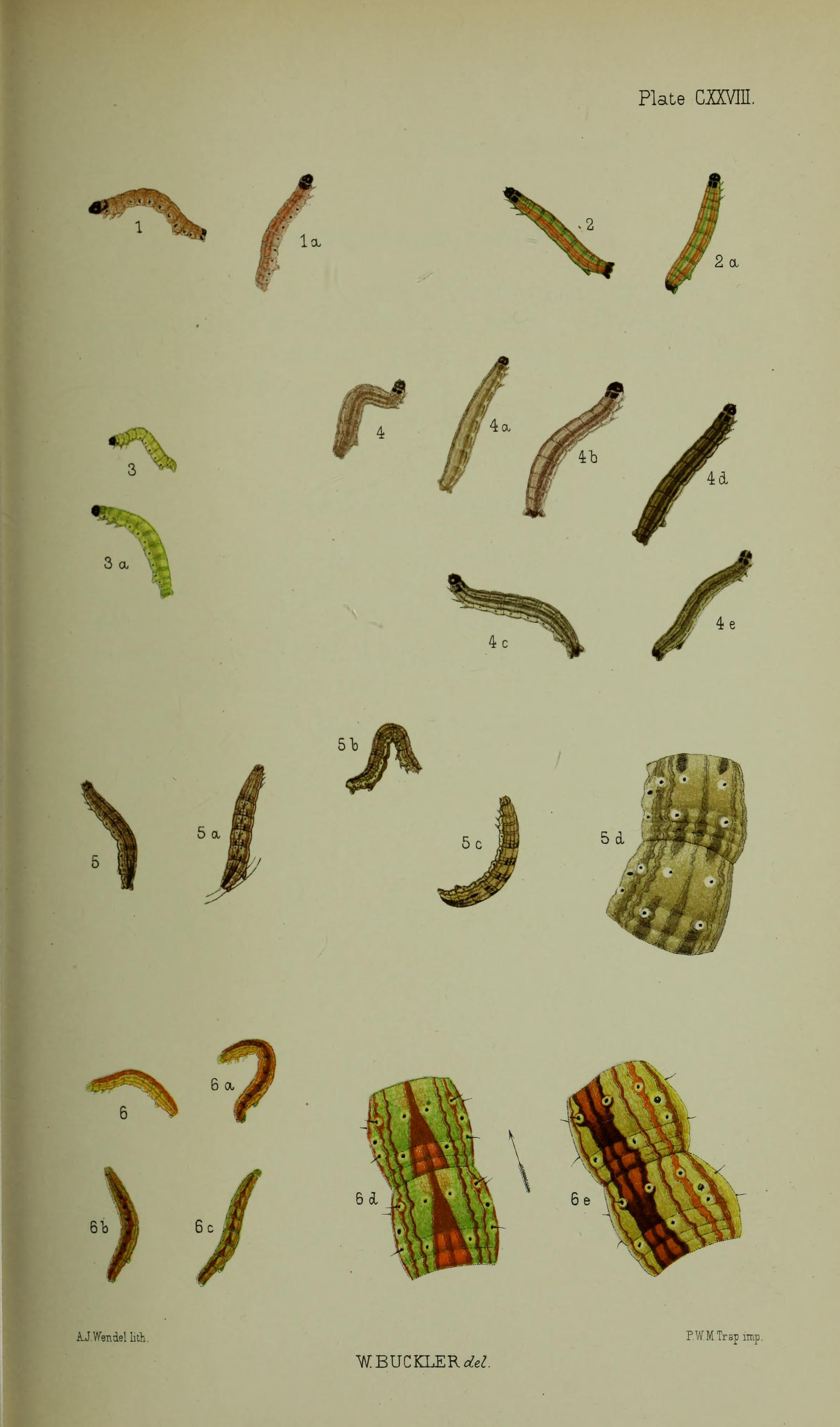
Figs. 3, 3 a: larvae after final moult

The larva is powerful, pale pink in colour with a brown head capsule.

== Biology ==
The species is preferably found in dry, grass-dominated meadows. The larvae feed on the seeds of Rhinanthus minor.
