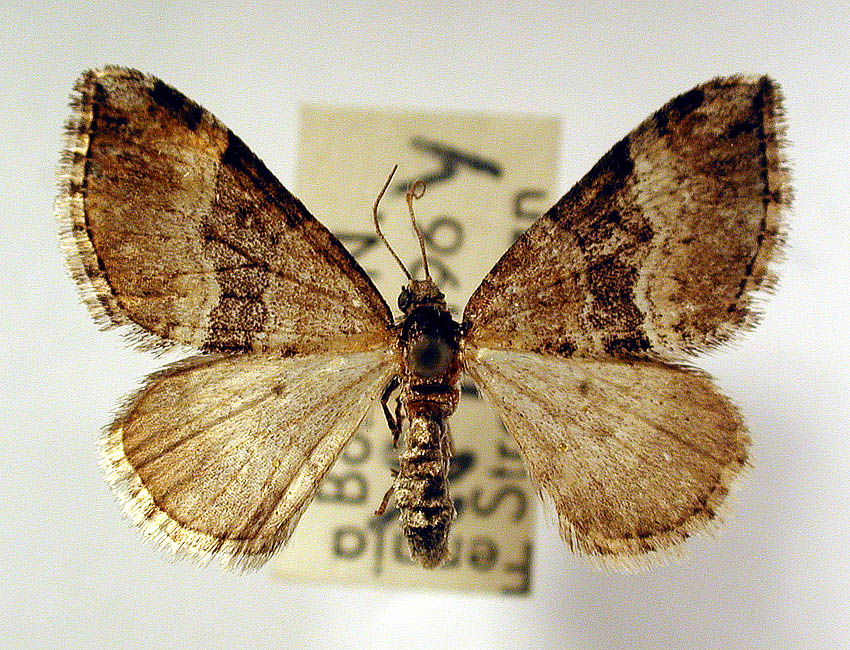

Scientific classification
- Kingdom: Animalia
- Phylum: Arthropoda
- Class: Insecta
- Order: Lepidoptera
- Family: Geometridae
- Genus: Perizoma
- Species: P. bifaciata

Binomial name
- Perizoma bifaciata (Haworth, 1809)

= Perizoma bifaciata =

Barred rivulet

Species of moth

Perizoma bifaciata, the barred rivulet, is a moth in the family of geometer moths (Geometridae). It was first described by Adrian Hardy Haworth in 1809.

== Description ==
It is small (wingspan 18–21 mm), thin, and more or less brown all over. The forewing' can vary in colour from light golden brown to dark red brown, often with a wide, darker coloured band in the centre, but this can vary. The band is covered on both sides with a wide, doubled, irregular white band. The wings have a white, triangular exterior. The hindwing is grey/white. The larva is light grey/green with short, white patches. See also Prout.

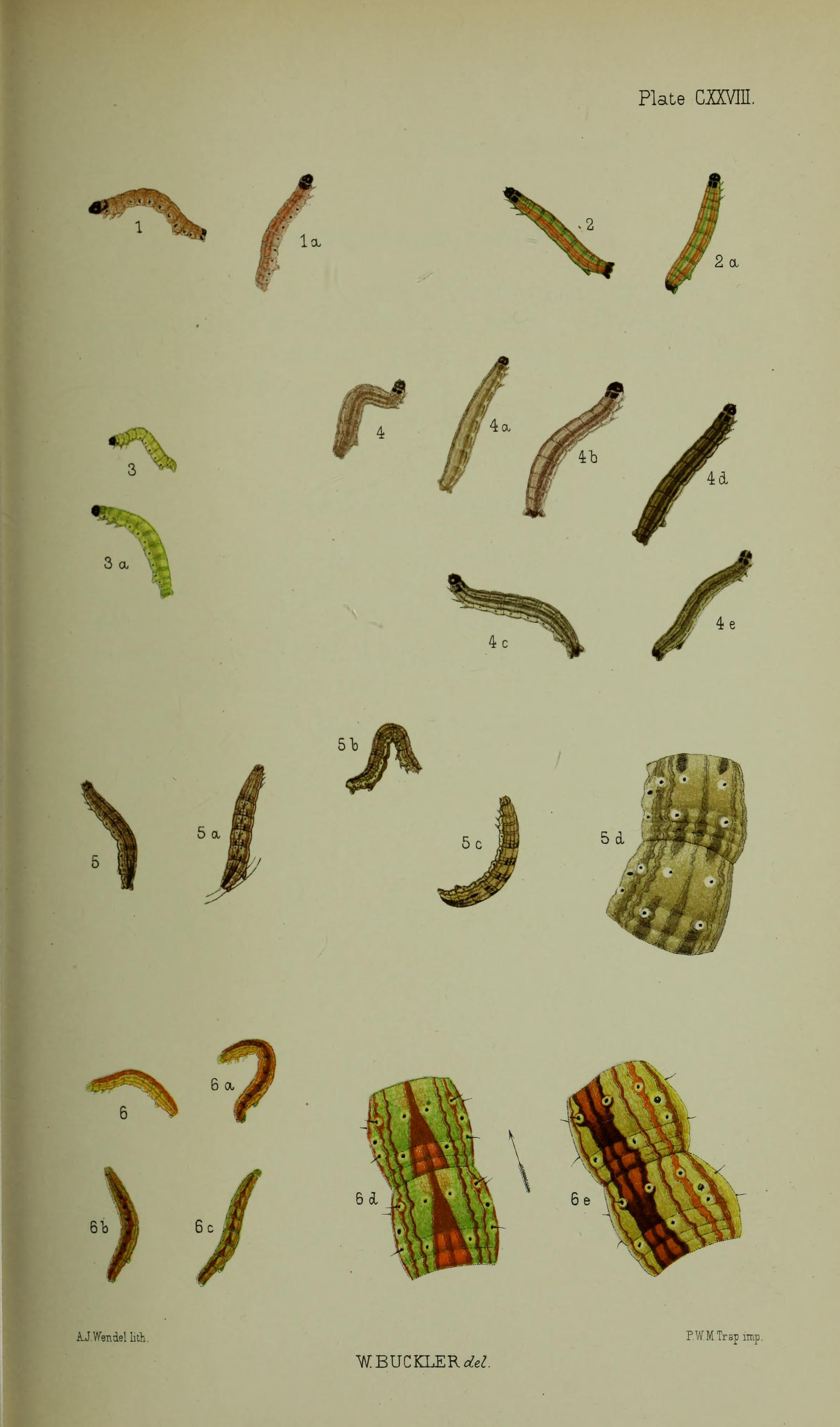
,5a,5b,5c larvae after final moult 5d enlarged detail of segments

== Life cycle ==
The species has larvae which live near plants such as Odontites and large specimens of Euphrasia, both in the figwort family (Scrophulariaceae). This species hibernates as pupae, sometimes for many years, which is unusual for geometer moths. The grown butterflies fly in July and August.

== Range ==
The species is found in the Palearctic realm.
