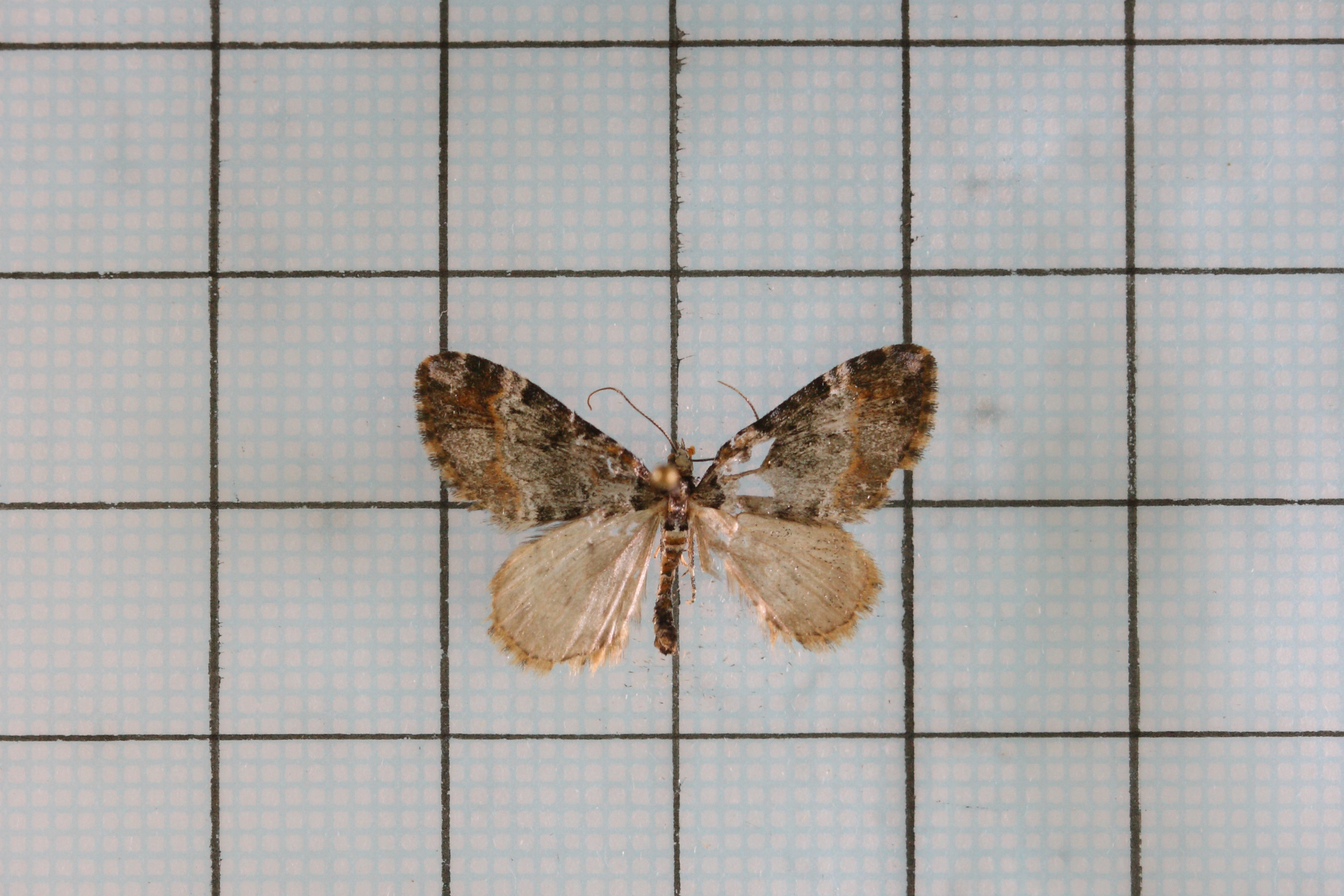

Scientific classification
- Kingdom: Animalia
- Phylum: Arthropoda
- Class: Insecta
- Order: Lepidoptera
- Family: Geometridae
- Genus: Martania
- Species: M. taiwana

Binomial name
- Martania taiwana (Wileman, 1911)

Synonyms
- Perizoma simulatum Wileman, 1911; Perizoma simulata; Perizoma taiwana Wileman, 1911; Perizoma arizanensis Wileman, 1915; Perizoma ochreotincta Wileman, 1915

= Martania taiwana =

Species of moth

Martania taiwana is a species of moth of the family Geometridae. It is found in Taiwan.

The wingspan is 17–21 mm.
