= Perizoma actuata =

Scientific classification
- Kingdom: Animalia
- Phylum: Arthropoda
- Clade: Pancrustacea
- Class: Insecta
- Order: Lepidoptera
- Family: Geometridae
- Tribe: Hydriomenini
- Genus: Perizoma
- Species: P. actuata

Binomial name
- Perizoma actuata (Pearsall, 1909)

Species of moth

Perizoma actuata is a species of geometrid moth in the family Geometridae. It is found in North America.

The MONA or Hodges number for Perizoma actuata is 7319.
