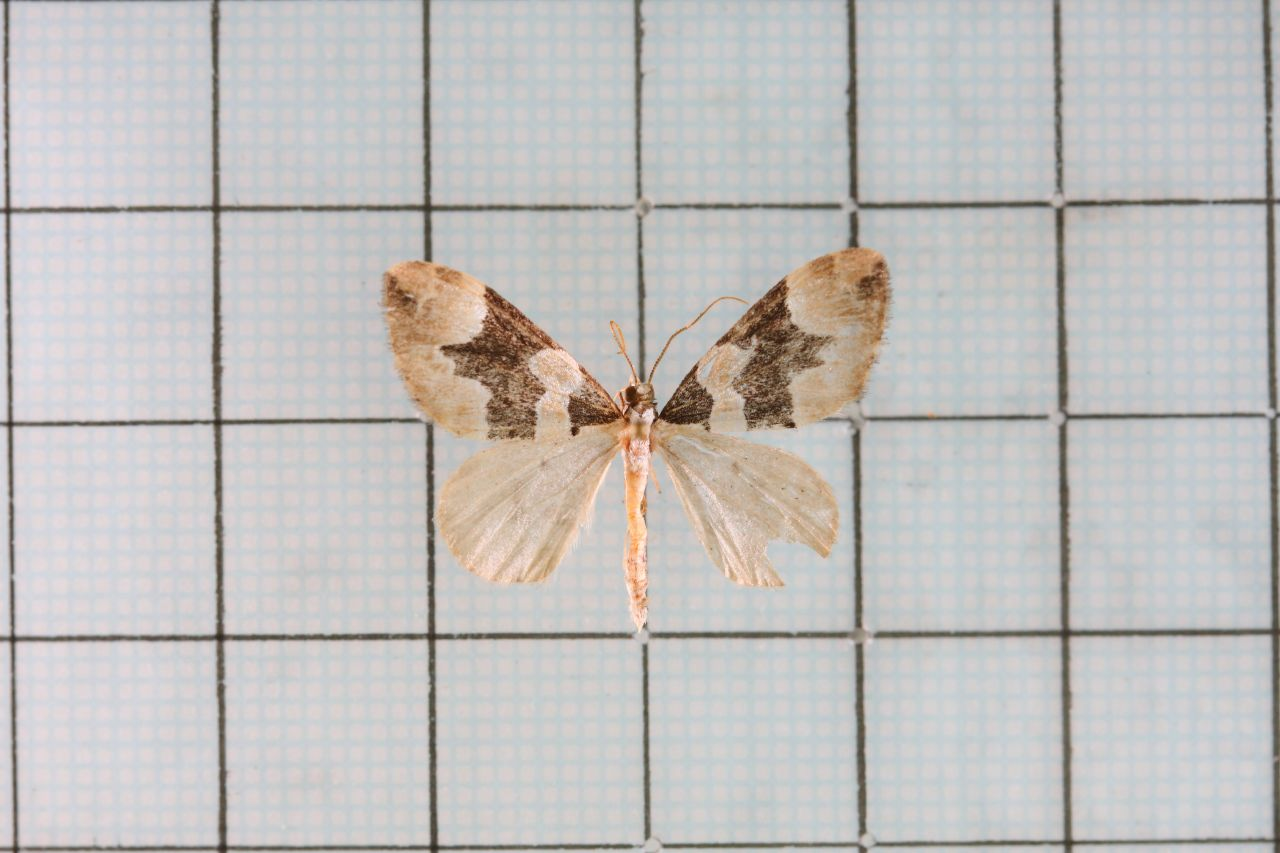

Scientific classification
- Kingdom: Animalia
- Phylum: Arthropoda
- Class: Insecta
- Order: Lepidoptera
- Family: Geometridae
- Genus: Gagitodes
- Species: G. omnifasciaria

Binomial name
- Gagitodes omnifasciaria (Inoue, 1998)

Synonyms
- Perizoma omnifasciaria Inoue, 1998

= Gagitodes omnifasciaria =

Species of moth

Gagitodes omnifasciaria is a moth in the family Geometridae first described by Hiroshi Inoue in 1998. It is found in Taiwan.
