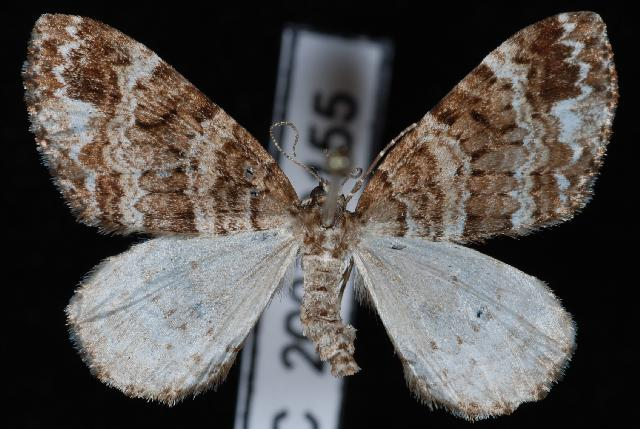

Scientific classification
- Domain: Eukaryota
- Kingdom: Animalia
- Phylum: Arthropoda
- Class: Insecta
- Order: Lepidoptera
- Family: Geometridae
- Genus: Perizoma
- Species: P. grandis

Binomial name
- Perizoma grandis (Hulst, 1896)

= Perizoma grandis =

Species of moth

Perizoma grandis is a species of geometrid moth in the family Geometridae. It is found in North America.

The MONA or Hodges number for Perizoma grandis is 7317.
