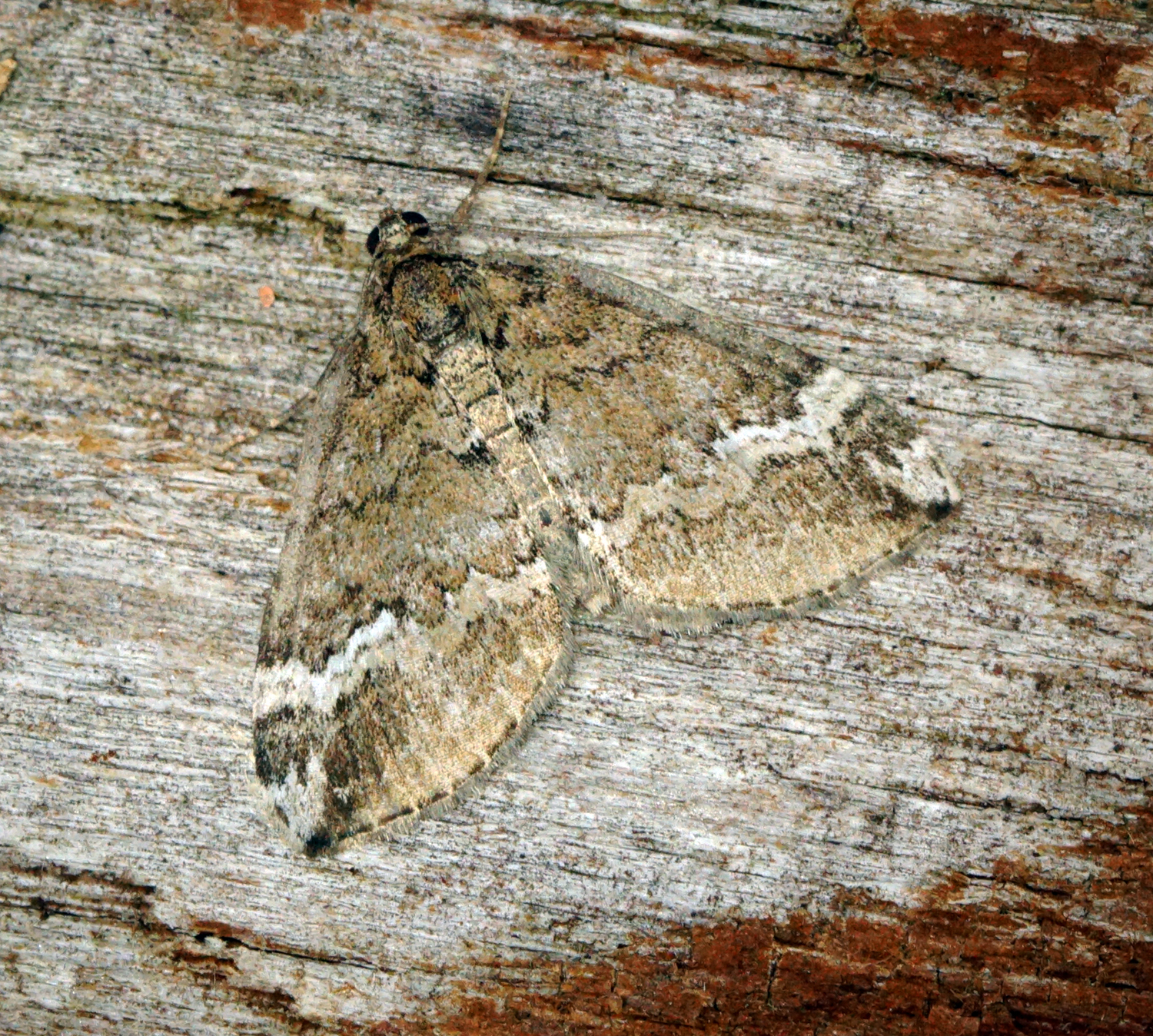

Scientific classification
- Kingdom: Animalia
- Phylum: Arthropoda
- Class: Insecta
- Order: Lepidoptera
- Family: Geometridae
- Genus: Perizoma
- Species: P. lugdunaria

Binomial name
- Perizoma lugdunaria Herrich-Schäffer, 1855

= Perizoma lugdunaria =

Species of insect

Perizoma lugdunaria is a moth belonging to the family Geometridae. The species was first described by Gottlieb August Wilhelm Herrich-Schäffer in 1885.

It is native to Europe.
