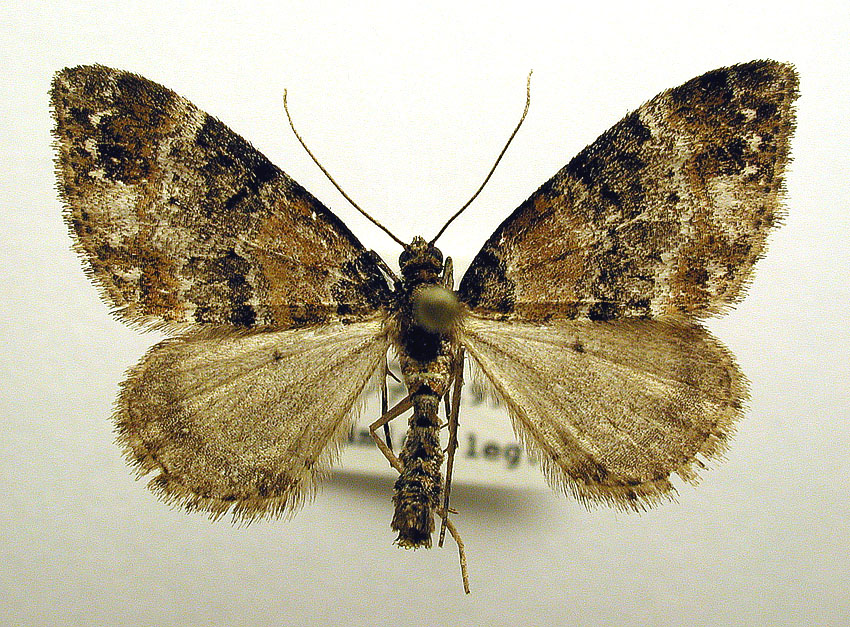

Scientific classification
- Kingdom: Animalia
- Phylum: Arthropoda
- Class: Insecta
- Order: Lepidoptera
- Family: Geometridae
- Genus: Martania
- Species: M. taeniata

Binomial name
- Martania taeniata (Stephens, 1831)

Synonyms
- Emmelesia taeniata Stephens, 1831; Martania taeniatum; Perizoma taeniata; Perizoma taeniatum

= Martania taeniata =

Species of moth

Martania taeniata, the barred carpet, is a moth of the family Geometridae. The species was first described by James Francis Stephens in 1831. It is found in large parts of the Palearctic realm.

Its wingspan is 19–28 mm. The ground colour of the forewings is ochreous. The forewings have a dark-coloured central band. They are very variable in size, pattern and colouring. The large white or whitish spot in the middle of the distal margin distinguishes M. taeniata from its nearest allies.

There is one generation per year with adults on wing in July and August.

The larvae probably feed on various moss species in the wild, but have been reared on various plants, such as Taraxacum officinale, Stellaria media and Polygonum aviculare. The larvae can be found from August to June. The species overwinters in the larval stage.

== Subspecies ==
- Martania taeniata taeniata
- Martania taeniata obsoletum (Djakonov, 1929) (Kamchatka)
