= Perizoma basaliata =

Scientific classification
- Kingdom: Animalia
- Phylum: Arthropoda
- Clade: Pancrustacea
- Class: Insecta
- Order: Lepidoptera
- Family: Geometridae
- Tribe: Hydriomenini
- Genus: Perizoma
- Species: P. basaliata

Binomial name
- Perizoma basaliata (Walker, 1862)

Species of moth

Perizoma basaliata, the square-patched carpet moth, is a species of geometrid moth in the family Geometridae. It is found in North America.

The MONA or Hodges number for Perizoma basaliata is 7316.
