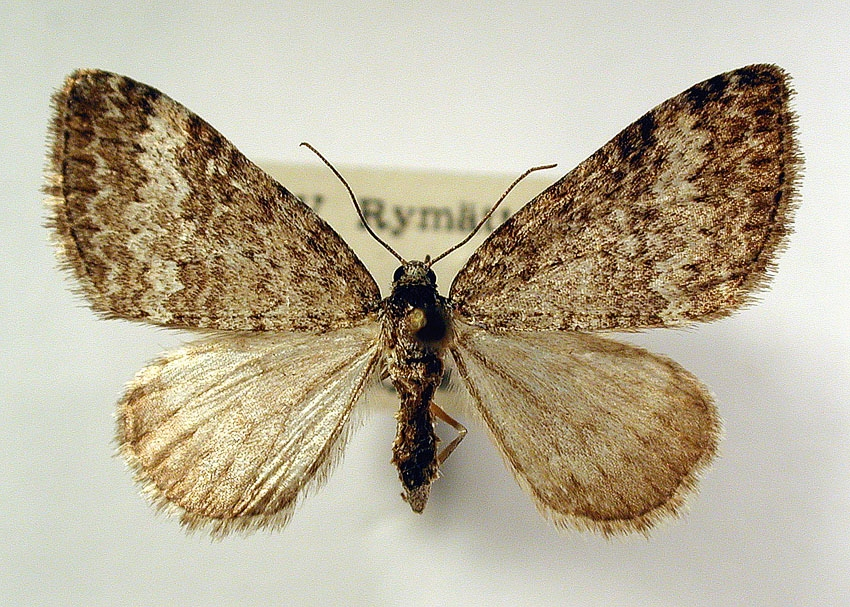

Scientific classification
- Domain: Eukaryota
- Kingdom: Animalia
- Phylum: Arthropoda
- Class: Insecta
- Order: Lepidoptera
- Family: Geometridae
- Genus: Perizoma
- Species: P. hydrata

Binomial name
- Perizoma hydrata (Treitschke, 1829)

Synonyms
- Acidalia hydrata Treitschke, 1829; Perizoma hydratum

= Perizoma hydrata =

Species of moth

Perizoma hydrata is a species of moth of the family Geometridae. It is found from most of Europe and the Caucasus through western Siberia to the Sayan Mountains and Altai and northern Mongolia.

The wingspan is 18–22 mm. There is one generation per year with adults on wing from the end of May to July.

The larvae feed on Caryophyllaceae species, Silene nutans, Silene cucubalus, Silene viscaria and Melandrium album. They feed on the capsules. The larvae can be found from June to July. It overwinters as a pupa.
