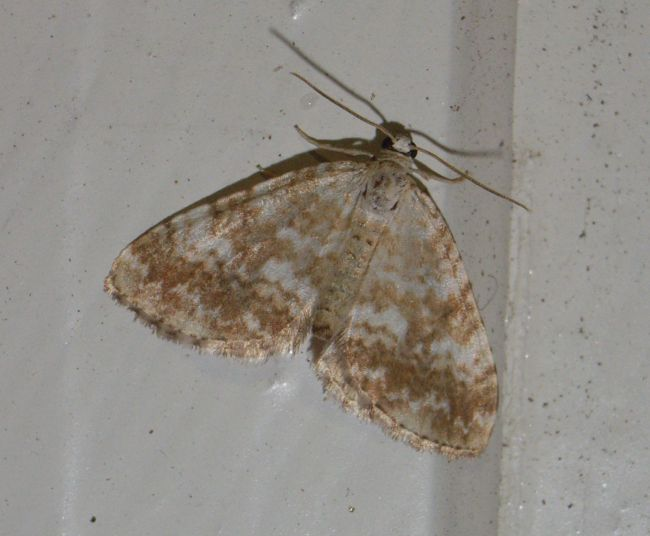

Scientific classification
- Domain: Eukaryota
- Kingdom: Animalia
- Phylum: Arthropoda
- Class: Insecta
- Order: Lepidoptera
- Family: Geometridae
- Genus: Perizoma
- Species: P. flavofasciata

Binomial name
- Perizoma flavofasciata (Thunberg, 1792)

Synonyms
- Perizoma flavofasciatum Thunberg, 1792; Acidalia decoloraria Boisduval, 1840; Cidaria decolorata (Hübner, 1799); Geometra decolorata Hübner, 1799; Larentia decolorata (Hübner, 1799); Melanippe decoloraria (Boisduval, 1840); Phalaena flavofasciata Thunberg, 1792

= Sandy carpet =

Species of moth

Perizoma flavofasciata, the sandy carpet or sandy rivulet, is a moth of the family Geometridae. The species was first described by Carl Peter Thunberg in 1792. It is found in most of Europe and northern Africa and east across the Palearctic to the Urals and the Altai Mountains. The species prefers meadow valleys, floodplains, waterside areas, bushy meadows and gardens. In the Alps it rises to 1500 metres.

== Description ==
Its wingspan is 26–32 mm. The forewing is brownish-yellow or sandy with three toothed white transverse bands. The innermost is close to the base and rather narrow, the two outermost are wider and double (with a yellow-brown stripe in the middle). the outer white band is interrupted in the middle. Otherwise, the wings have several thin white transverse stripes, more or less complete, but the brownish-yellow ground colour predominates. The hind wing is white. The larva is pale pink with dark pink longitudinal stripes on either side of the dorsum. The area between the two longitudinal stripes is white. See also Prout.

== Biology ==
The larvae of sandy carpet moths live in flowers and capsules of carnations (family Caryophyllaceae); in particular they feed on the seed pods of various campions (Silene species).

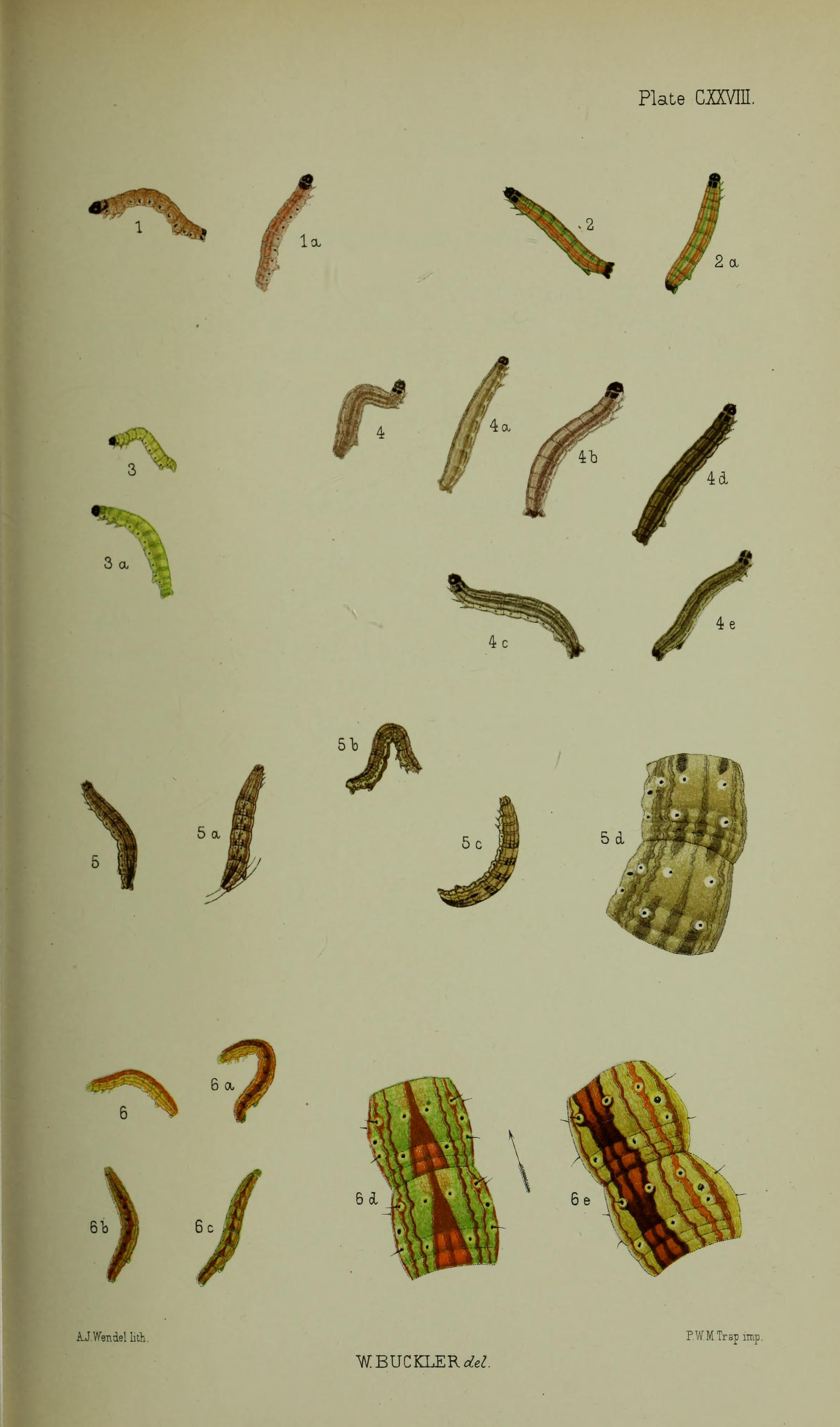
Figs 4,4a,4b,4c,4d,4e larvae after final moult

The flight period is from late May to early August. It is scarce and overwinters as a pupa.
