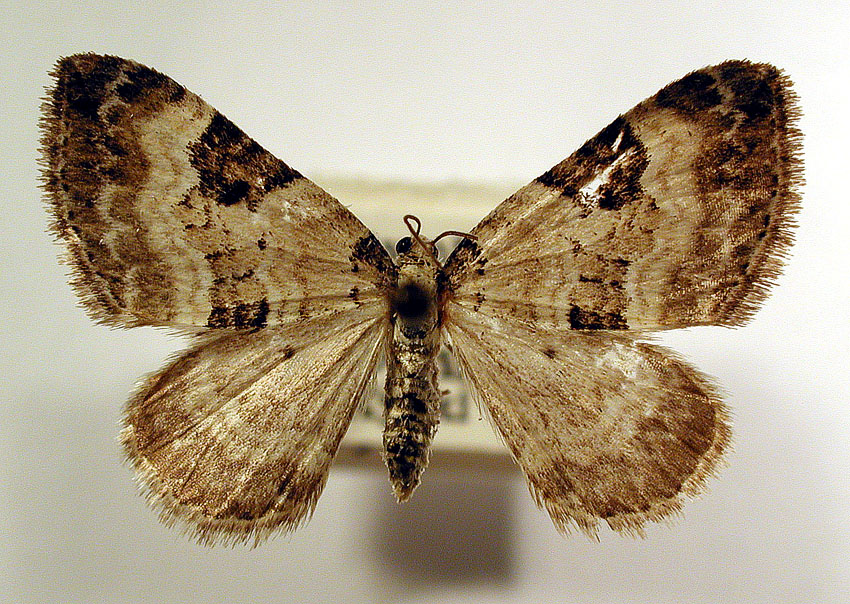

Scientific classification
- Domain: Eukaryota
- Kingdom: Animalia
- Phylum: Arthropoda
- Class: Insecta
- Order: Lepidoptera
- Family: Geometridae
- Genus: Perizoma
- Species: P. blandiata

Binomial name
- Perizoma blandiata (Denis & Schiffermüller, 1775)

Synonyms
- Geometra blandiata Denis & Schiffermuller, 1775; Perizoma blandiatum; Phalaena adaequata Borkhausen, 1794; Cidaria perfasciata Prout, 1914

= Perizoma blandiata =

Species of moth

Perizoma blandiata, the pretty pinion, is a moth of the family Geometridae. The species was first described by Michael Denis and Ignaz Schiffermüller in 1775. It is found from most of central and northern Europe to central Asia as far as the Khangai Mountains.

The wingspan is 19–23 mm. It is related to P. minorata but with the band between the basal and median obsolete or very shadowy (extremely pale brown) the median band very dark anteriorly but pale in the middle, except on the veins, the hindwing rather more strongly marked. — ab. coarctata Prout has the median band narrowed to a mere thread. — perfasciata form. nov [Prout]. has the median band dark throughout and appears to form a constant local race in the Hebrides.

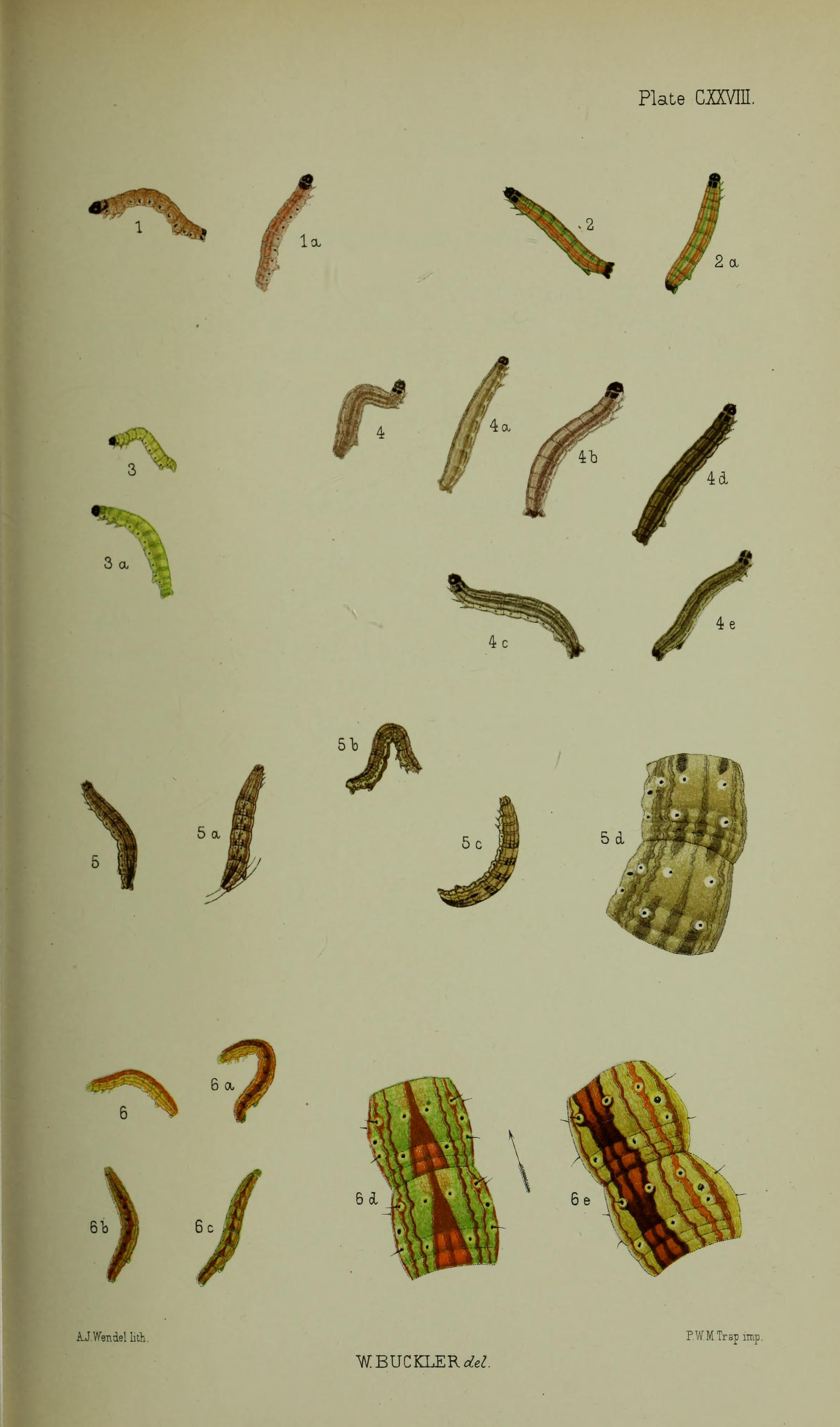
Figs.6,6a,6b,6c larvae in various stages 6d,6e enlarged detail of segments

The larva is short and powerful with short bristles and pale green with a wide red longitudinal stripe on each side of the back.This colour combination represents an excellent camouflage and can be interpreted as an imitation of the reddish stem of the Euphrasia on which it feeds.

The species is found on moors and other open places.

There is one generation per year with adults on wing from the end of July to August.

The larvae feed on Euphrasia species. The eggs are deposited on or near the flower buds. The larvae can be found from July to September. It overwinters as a pupa.

== Subspecies ==
- Perizoma blandiata blandiata
- Perizoma blandiata perfasciata Prout, 1914 (Hebrides, Isle of Rum, Faroe Islands)
