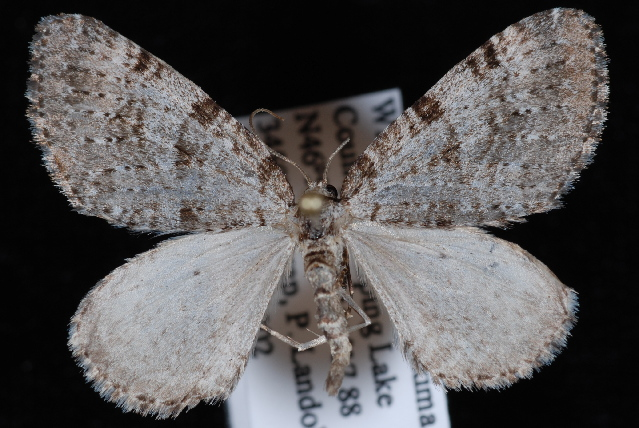

Scientific classification
- Domain: Eukaryota
- Kingdom: Animalia
- Phylum: Arthropoda
- Class: Insecta
- Order: Lepidoptera
- Family: Geometridae
- Genus: Perizoma
- Species: P. curvilinea

Binomial name
- Perizoma curvilinea (Hulst, 1896)

= Perizoma curvilinea =

Species of moth

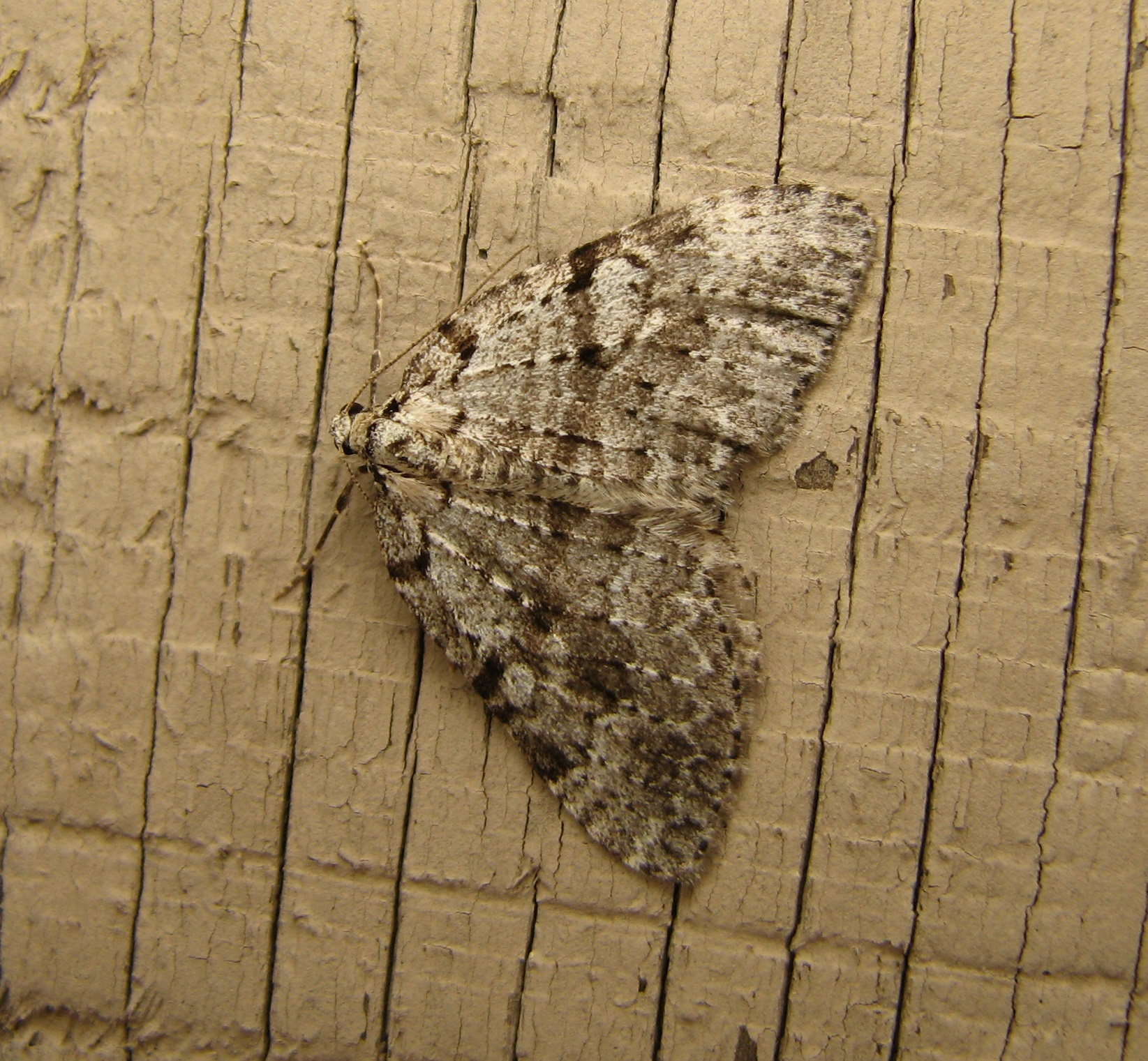
P. curvilinea in Oregon

Perizoma curvilinea is a species of geometrid moth in the family Geometridae. It is found in North America.

The MONA or Hodges number for Perizoma curvilinea is 7324.
