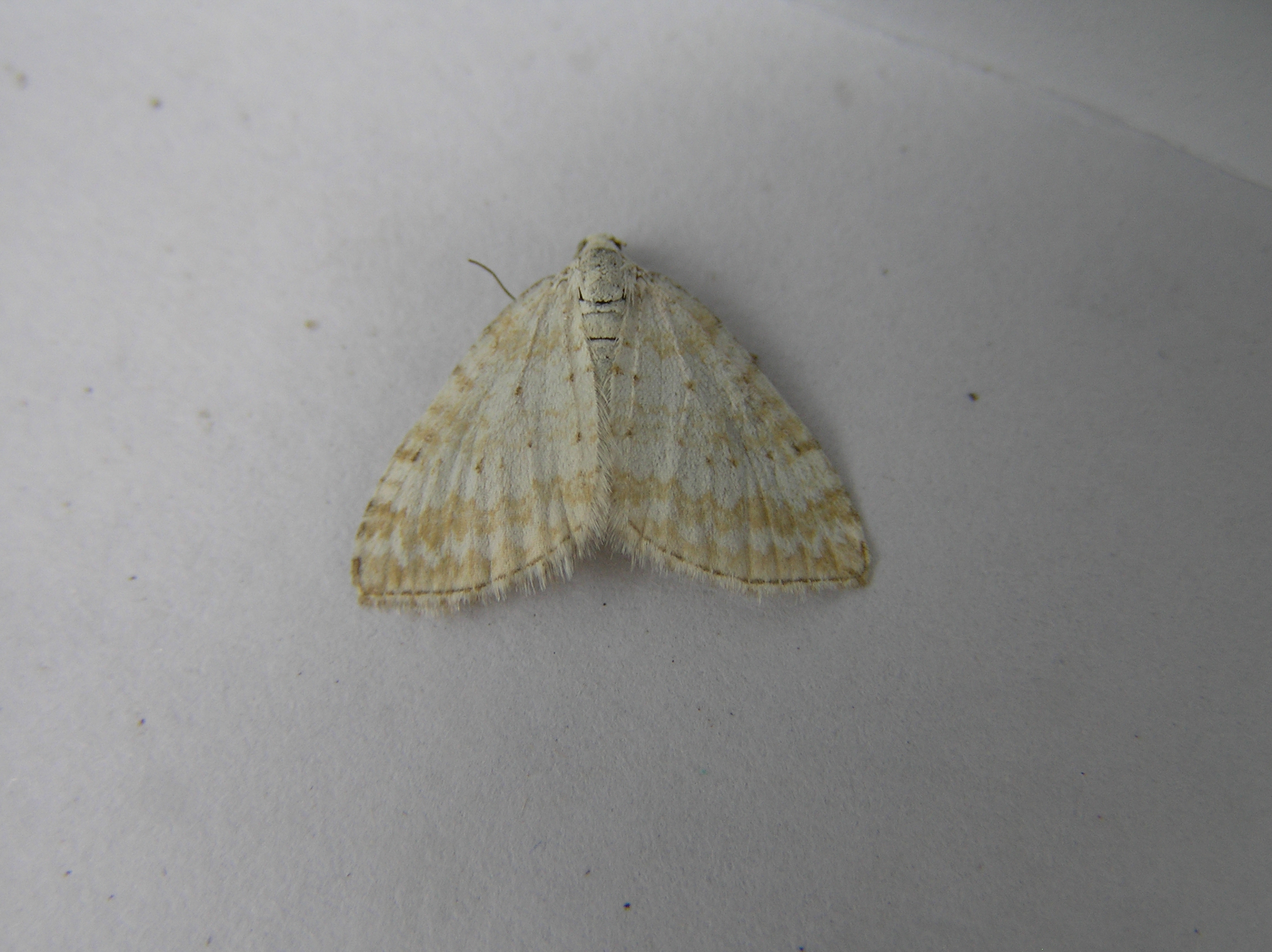
- Grass rivulet (Perizoma albulata) imago

Scientific classification
- Kingdom: Animalia
- Phylum: Arthropoda
- Clade: Pancrustacea
- Class: Insecta
- Order: Lepidoptera
- Family: Geometridae
- Tribe: Hydriomenini
- Genus: Perizoma; Hübner, 1825

Type species
- Geometra albulata Denis & Schiffermüller, 1775

Diversity
- Over 150 species

Synonyms
- Emmelesia Stephens, 1829a; Emmelesia Stephens, 1829b (non Stephens, 1829a: preoccupied); Emmelesia Stephens, 1831 (non Stephens, 1829a: preoccupied); Opisogonia Herrich-Schäffer, 1856 (non Herrich-Schäffer, 1855: preoccupied); Zerynthia Curtis, 1830 (non Ochsenheimer, 1816: preoccupied); and see text

= Perizoma =

Genus of moths

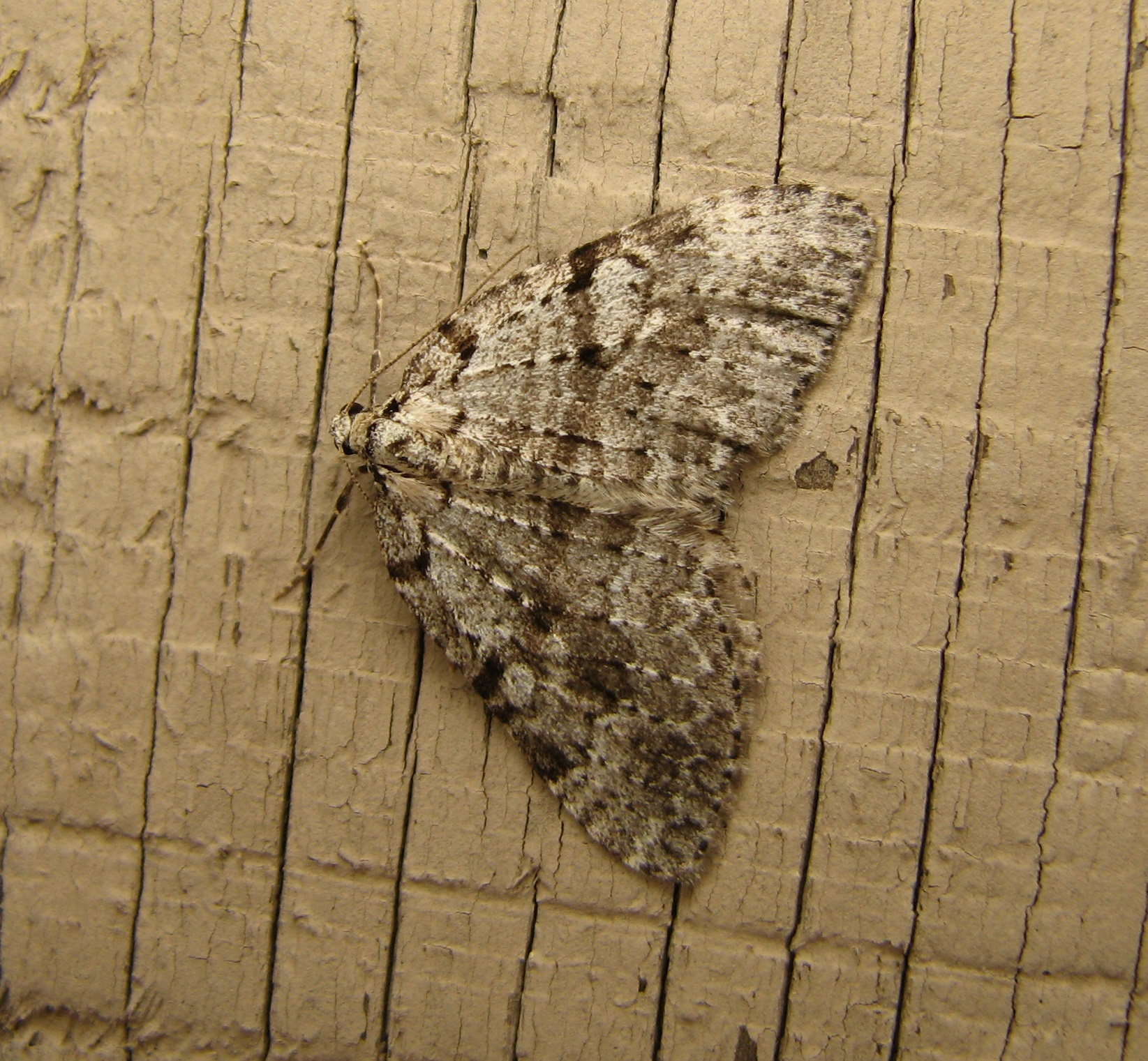
P. curvilinea in Oregon

Perizoma is a genus in the geometer moth family (Geometridae). It is the type genus of tribe Perizomini in subfamily Larentiinae. The tribe is considered monotypic by those who include the genera Gagitodes, Martania and Mesotype in Perizoma. Some other less closely related species formerly placed here are now elsewhere in the Larentiinae, e.g. in Entephria of the tribe Larentiini.

Either way, there are more than 150 species of Perizoma currently known, with a generally Northern Hemisphere distribution (e.g. 14 occurring in Europe), and new ones still being described occasionally. Many of them are called rivulets ("the" rivulet is P. affinitata specifically), while others are known as carpets, a common name for Larentiinae in general.

It was first described by Jacob Hübner in 1825. One of its junior synonyms is Emmelesia, proposed by James Francis Stephens no less than three times – once validly in 1829, and within the next two years twice more invalidly, covering a total of 18 species. Another invalid name of Perizoma – Opisogonia, chosen by Gottlieb August Wilhelm Herrich-Schäffer in 1856 – had already been used by the same author the year before for a different geometer moth genus.

== Selected species ==
Species of Perizoma include:

- Perizoma ablata (Hulst, 1896)
- Perizoma ablegata (Staudinger, 1897)
- Perizoma actuata (Pearsall, 1909)
- Perizoma adequata (Borkhausen, 1794)
- Perizoma aequilimbata (Lempke, 1950)
- Perizoma affinis (Moore, 1888)
- Perizoma affinitata (Stephens, 1831) – the rivulet
- Perizoma alaskae (Hulst, 1896)
- Perizoma albida Sohn-Rethel, 1929
- Perizoma albidella Prout, 1938
- Perizoma albidivisa Warren, 1893
- Perizoma albiflua Prout, 1939
- Perizoma albofasciata (Moore, 1888)
- Perizoma albulata (Denis & Schiffermüller, 1775) – grass rivulet
- Perizoma alchemillata (Linnaeus, 1758) – small rivulet
- Perizoma amblyodes Fletcher, 1961
- Perizoma amplata Warren, 1904
- Perizoma anguliferata Maassen, 1890
- Perizoma antisticta Prout, 1938
  - Perizoma antisticta leucatma Fletcher, 1961
  - Perizoma antisticta methemon Prout, 1939
- Perizoma apiceflava Prout, 1910
- Perizoma apicesignata Dognin, 1913
- Perizoma apicistrigata Warren, 1893
- Perizoma arcillata Dognin, 1893
- Perizoma argentipuncta Inoue, 1982
- Perizoma aspersa Dognin, 1904
- Perizoma aurantaria E. D. Jones, 1921
- Perizoma aureoviridis Warren, 1904
- Perizoma baptopennis Dyar, 1916
- Perizoma barrassoi Zahm, Cieslak & Hausmann, 2005
- Perizoma basaliata Walker, 1862
- Perizoma basiplaga Schaus, 1901
- Perizoma bicolor Warren, 1893
- Perizoma bifaciata Haworth, 1809 – barred rivulet
- Perizoma blandiata (Denis & Schiffermüller, 1775) – pretty pinion
- Perizoma bogotata Walker, 1862
- Perizoma brunneopicta Dognin, 1913
- Perizoma caeruleofascia Inoue, 1982
- Perizoma caeruleosecta Prout, 1916
- Perizoma candidaria Costantini, 1922
- Perizoma carnata Packard, 1874
- Perizoma carnepicta Warren, 1905
- Perizoma carnetincta Dognin, 1911
- Perizoma cerva Hampson, 1902
- Perizoma conjuncta Warren, 1893
- Perizoma constricta Warren, 1901
- Perizoma contrita (Prout, 1914)
- Perizoma costiguttata (Hulst, 1896)
- Perizoma curvilinea (Hulst, 1896)
- Perizoma custodiata (Guenée, 1857)
- Perizoma decorata (Moore, 1888)
- Perizoma epictata Barnes & McDunnough, 1916
- Perizoma fasciata Warren, 1893
- Perizoma flavofasciata (Thunberg, 1792) – sandy carpet
- Perizoma flavosparsata (Wagner, 1926)
- Perizoma fulvida (Butler, 1881)
- Perizoma fulvimacula (Hampson, 1896)
- Perizoma grandis (Hulst, 1896)
- Perizoma herrichiata (Snellen, 1874)
- Perizoma interrupta Warren, 1893
- Perizoma haasi (Hedemann, 1881)
- Perizoma hydrata (Treitschke, 1829)
- Perizoma illepida Inoue, 1955
- Perizoma incultaria (Herrich-Schäffer, 1848)
- Perizoma interrupta (Grossbeck, 1910)
- Perizoma juracolaria (Wehrli, 1919)
- Perizoma lacernigera (Butler, 1889)
- Perizoma lacteiguttata Warren, 1893
- Perizoma lugdunaria (Herrich-Schäffer, 1855)
- Perizoma maculata (Moore, 1888)
- Perizoma minimata (Staudinger, 1897)
- Perizoma minorata (Treitschke, 1828) – heath rivulet
- Perizoma minuta (Butler, 1889)
- Perizoma mordax Prout, 1939
- Perizoma obsoletata (Herrich-Schäffer, 1838) (including P. reisseri)
- Perizoma ochreata (Grossbeck, 1910)
- Perizoma olivacea Warren, 1893)
- Perizoma oxygramma (Hulst, 1896)
- Perizoma parahydrata Alberti, 1969
- Perizoma parvaria (Leech, 1891)
- Perizoma plumbeata (Moore, 1888)
- Perizoma rectifasciata Hampson, 1902
- Perizoma schistacea (Moore, 1888)
- Perizoma saxea (Wileman, 1911)
- Perizoma seriata (Moore, 1888)
- Perizoma saxicola Tikhonov, 1994
- Perizoma tenuifascia Warren, 1896
- Perizoma triplagiata Warren, 1896
- Perizoma variabilis Warren, 1893
