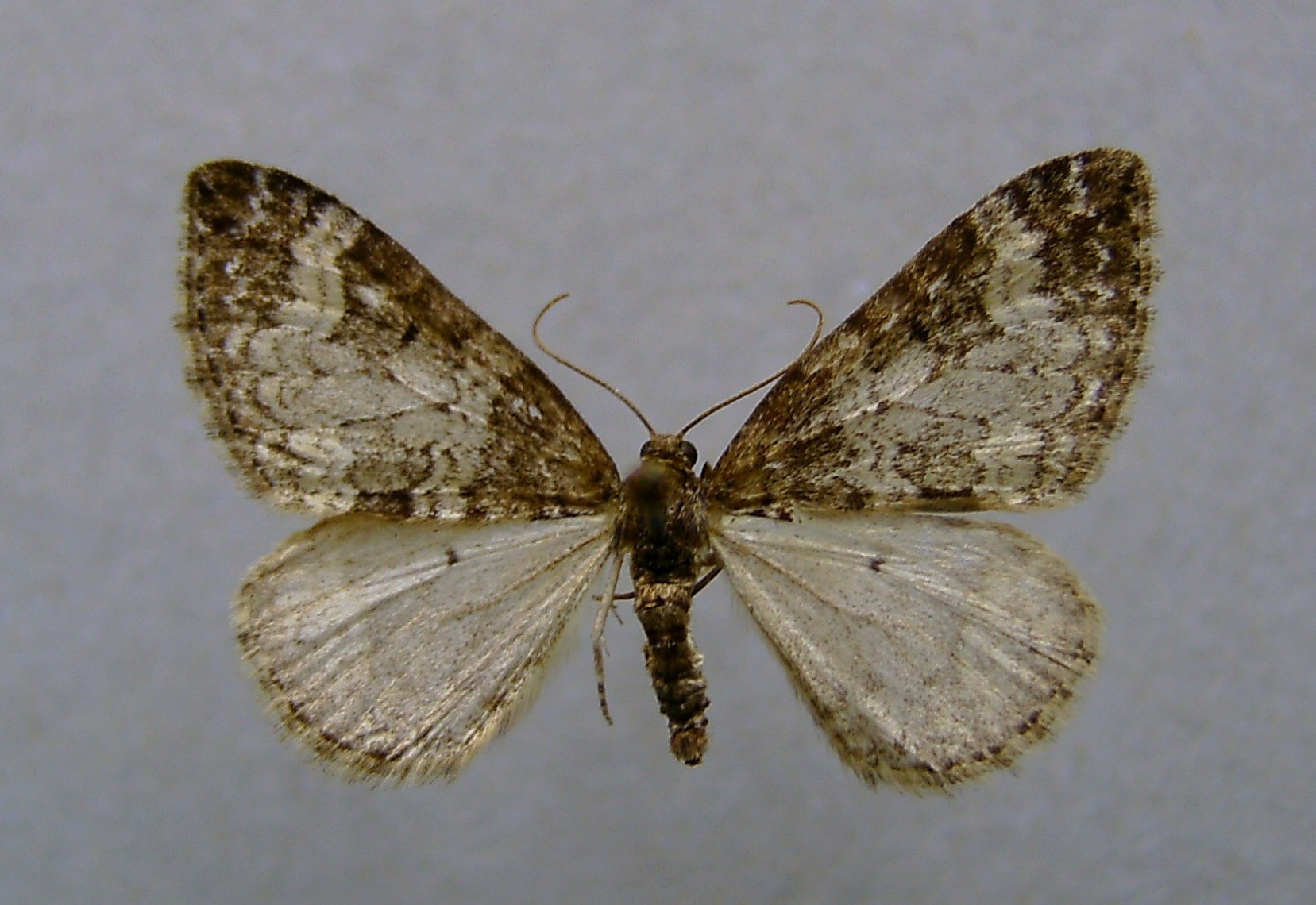

Scientific classification
- Domain: Eukaryota
- Kingdom: Animalia
- Phylum: Arthropoda
- Class: Insecta
- Order: Lepidoptera
- Family: Geometridae
- Genus: Perizoma
- Species: P. obsoletata

Binomial name
- Perizoma obsoletata (Herrich-Schäffer, 1838)

Synonyms
- Larentia obsoletata Herrich-Schäffer, 1838; Larentia alpicolaria Herrich-Schaffer, 1848; Larentia reisseri Schawerda, 1932; Larentia avilaria Reisser, 1936

= Perizoma obsoletata =

Species of moth

Perizoma obsoletata is a species of moth of the family Geometridae. It is found in the Pyrenees, the Massif Central, the Apennine Mountains, on Corsica, in the Alps and Swiss Prealps, the Jura Mountains, the Black Forest, the Swabian Jura, the Sudetes, the High Tatras, the Carpathian Mountains and the mountains of the Balkan Peninsula.

The wingspan is 22–26 mm. The ground colour of the forewings varies from white to grey. There is one generation per year with adults on wing from the June to August.

The larvae feed on Gentiana lutea, Gentiana punctata, Gentiana pannonica, Gentiana purpurea and Gentiana asclepiadea. The larvae can be found in August and September. The species overwinters in the pupal stage.

== Subspecies ==
- Perizoma obsoletata obsoletata
- Perizoma obsoletata avilaria Reisser, 1936 (Spain)
