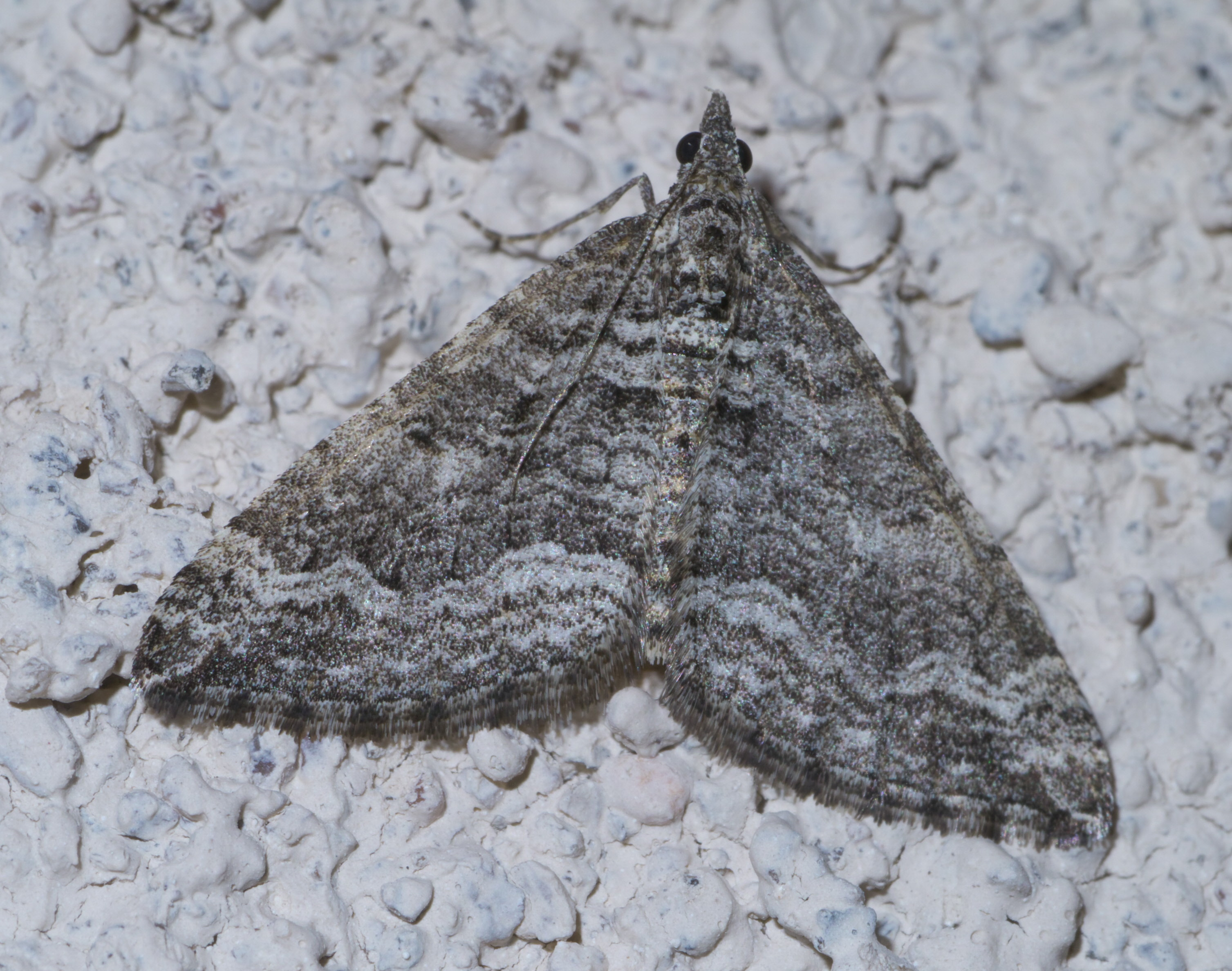

Scientific classification
- Kingdom: Animalia
- Phylum: Arthropoda
- Class: Insecta
- Order: Lepidoptera
- Family: Geometridae
- Tribe: Hydriomenini
- Genus: Perizoma
- Species: P. custodiata

Binomial name
- Perizoma custodiata (Guenée in Boisduval & Guenée, 1858)

= Perizoma custodiata =

Species of moth

Perizoma custodiata is a species of geometrid moth in the family Geometridae. It is found in North America.

The MONA or Hodges number for Perizoma custodiata is 7328.
