= Perizoma epictata =

Scientific classification
- Domain: Eukaryota
- Kingdom: Animalia
- Phylum: Arthropoda
- Class: Insecta
- Order: Lepidoptera
- Family: Geometridae
- Genus: Perizoma
- Species: P. epictata

Binomial name
- Perizoma epictata Barnes & McDunnough, 1916

Species of moth

Perizoma epictata is a species of moth in the family Geometridae first described by William Barnes and James Halliday McDunnough in 1916. It is found in North America.

The MONA or Hodges number for Perizoma epictata is 7326.
