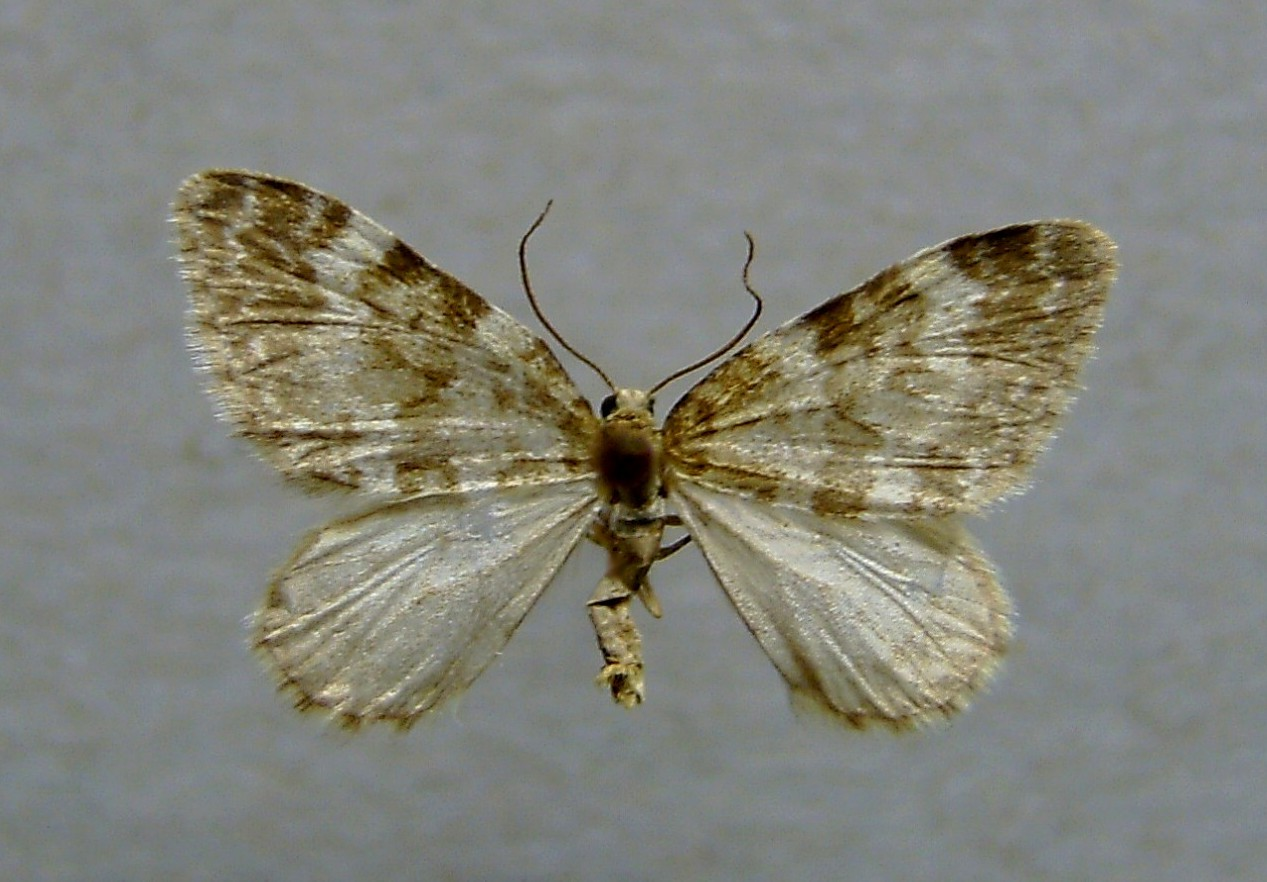

Scientific classification
- Domain: Eukaryota
- Kingdom: Animalia
- Phylum: Arthropoda
- Class: Insecta
- Order: Lepidoptera
- Family: Geometridae
- Genus: Perizoma
- Species: P. incultaria

Binomial name
- Perizoma incultaria (Herrich-Schäffer, 1848)

Synonyms
- Larentia incultaria Herrich-Schäffer, 1848; Cidaria incultaria

= Perizoma incultaria =

Species of moth

Perizoma incultaria is a species of moth of the family Geometridae. It is found from the Alps to the Carpathian Mountains and the mountains of the Balkan Peninsula.

The wingspan is 19–21 mm. Adults are on wing from May to August.

The larvae feed on Primula, Bartsia and Saxifraga species. The larvae of the first generation mine the leaves of their host plant.
