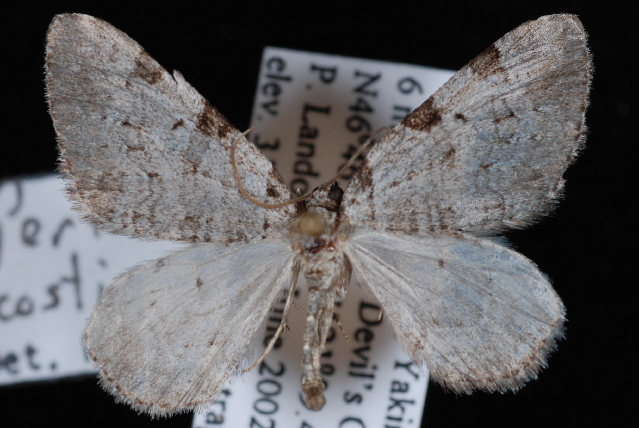

Scientific classification
- Domain: Eukaryota
- Kingdom: Animalia
- Phylum: Arthropoda
- Class: Insecta
- Order: Lepidoptera
- Family: Geometridae
- Tribe: Hydriomenini
- Genus: Perizoma
- Species: P. costiguttata

Binomial name
- Perizoma costiguttata (Hulst, 1896)

= Perizoma costiguttata =

Species of moth

Perizoma costiguttata is a species of geometrid moth in the family Geometridae. It is found in North America.

The MONA or Hodges number for Perizoma costiguttata is 7325.
