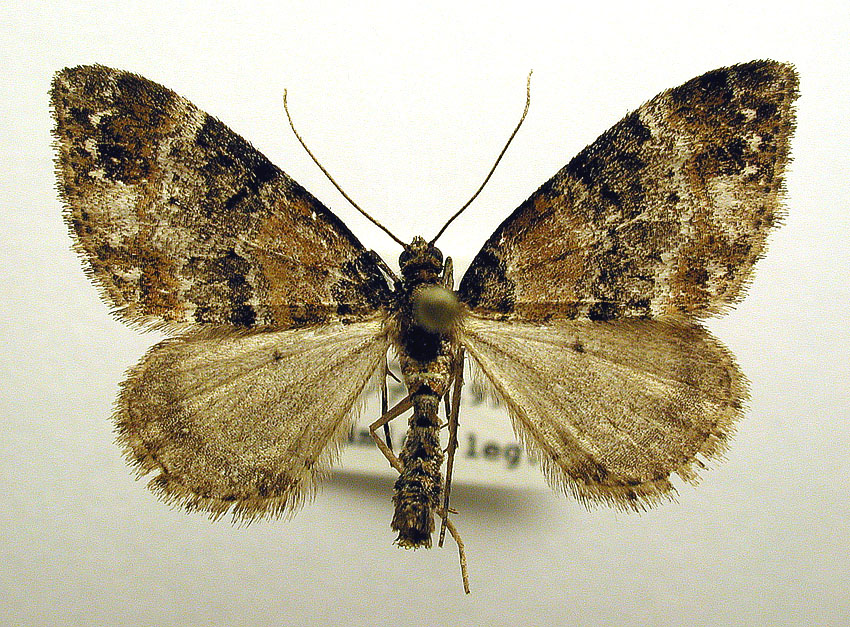

Scientific classification
- Kingdom: Animalia
- Phylum: Arthropoda
- Clade: Pancrustacea
- Class: Insecta
- Order: Lepidoptera
- Family: Geometridae
- Subfamily: Larentiinae
- Genus: Martania; Mironov, 2000

= Martania =

Genus of moths

Martania is a genus of moths in the family Geometridae first described by Vladimir Mironov in 2000. It is sometimes included in Perizoma.

== Selected species ==
Species include:

- Martania albofasciata (Moore, 1888)
- Martania denigrata Inoue, 2004
- Martania fulvida (Butler, 1881)
- Martania minimata (Staudinger, 1897)
- Martania obscurata (Bastelberger, 1909)
- Martania saxea (Wileman, 1911)
- Martania seriata (Moore, 1888)
- Martania sugii (Inoue, 1998)
- Martania taeniata (Stephens, 1831)
- Martania taiwana (Wileman, 1911)
