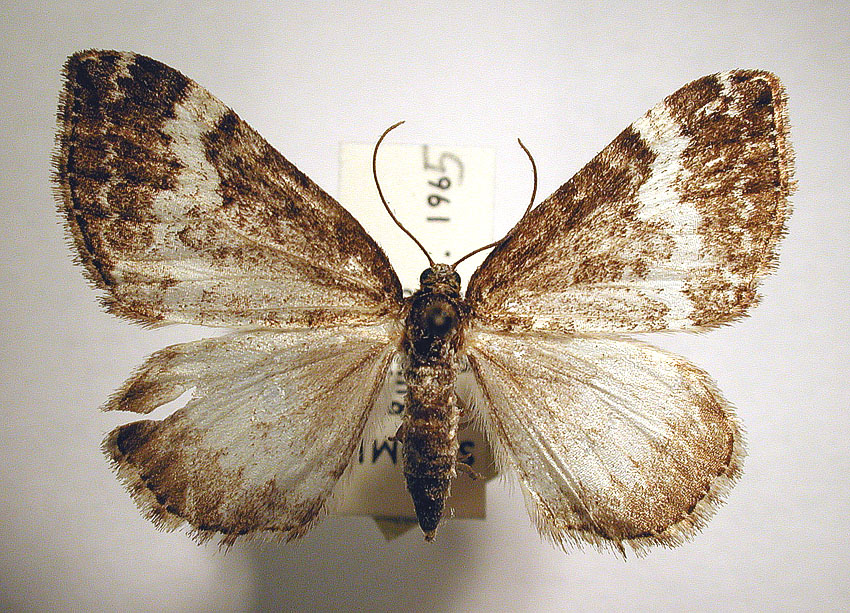

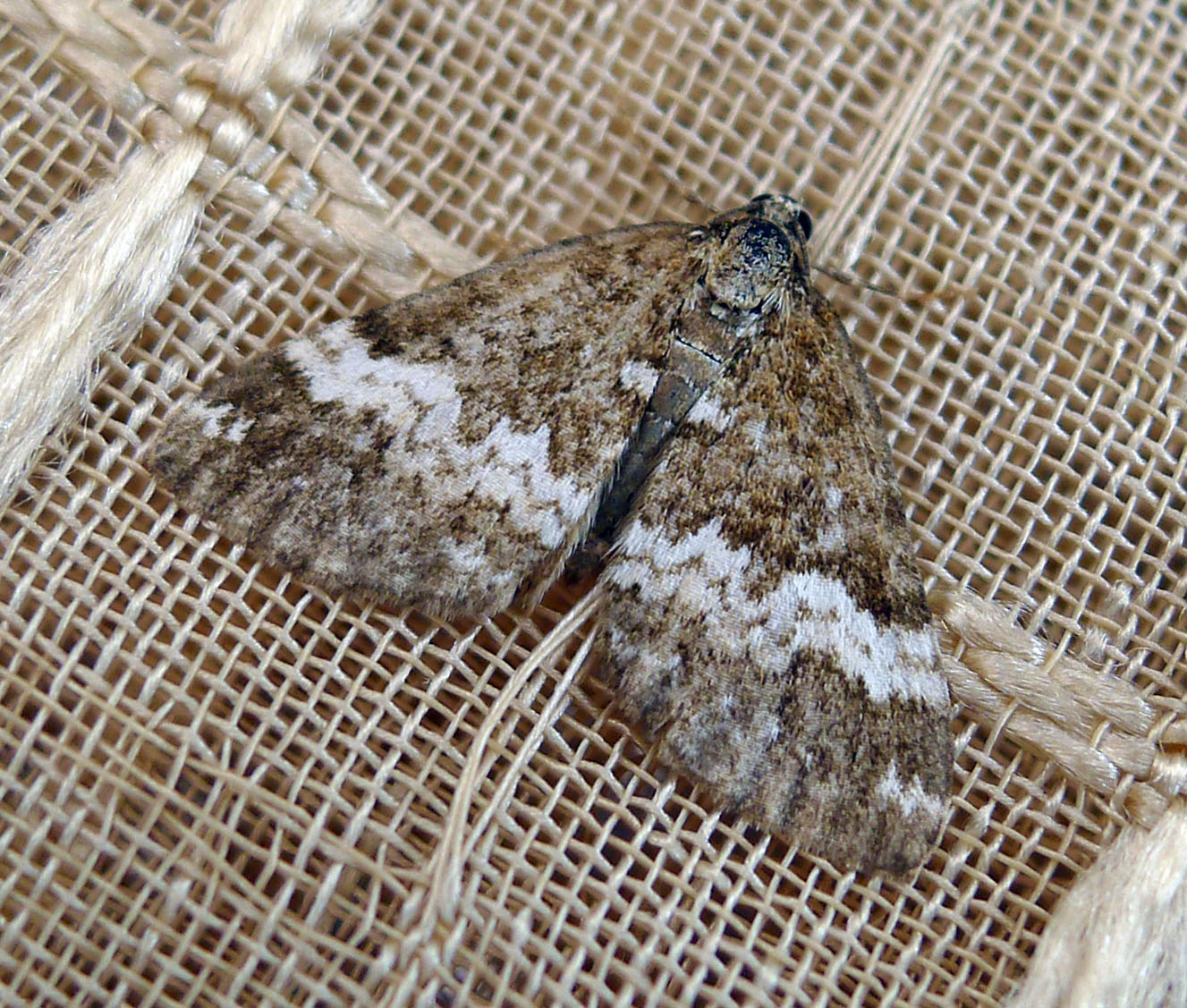

Scientific classification
- Kingdom: Animalia
- Phylum: Arthropoda
- Clade: Pancrustacea
- Class: Insecta
- Order: Lepidoptera
- Family: Geometridae
- Genus: Perizoma
- Species: P. affinitata

Binomial name
- Perizoma affinitata (Stephens, 1831)

Synonyms
- Emmelesia affinitata Stephens, 1831; Perizoma affinitatum

= Perizoma affinitata =

Species of moth

Perizoma affinitata, the rivulet, is a species of moth of the family Geometridae. It was first described by James Francis Stephens in 1831 and it is found in most of Europe.

Its wingspan is 24–30 mm and is characterized by the narrow white postmedian band of the forewing and especially by the dark hindwing, with only a narrow, divided white or whitish band. Northern and western Germany, and rather less extreme from England and according to Otto Staudinger it is distributed in central and northern Europe and Romania. - rivinata Fisch.-Rossl. has the white on the forewing much extended and the hindwing broadly or almost wholly white. It belongs chiefly to northern or mountain districts, but sometimes occurs as an aberration with the type England, N. Norway, the Alps, Carpathians. - magistraria Trti. and Verity is larger, the forewing grey, not brown, but darker than in hydrata and with broader white band; hindwing greyish with double whitish band; underside like that of rivinata. Terme di Valdieri, Maritime Alps.

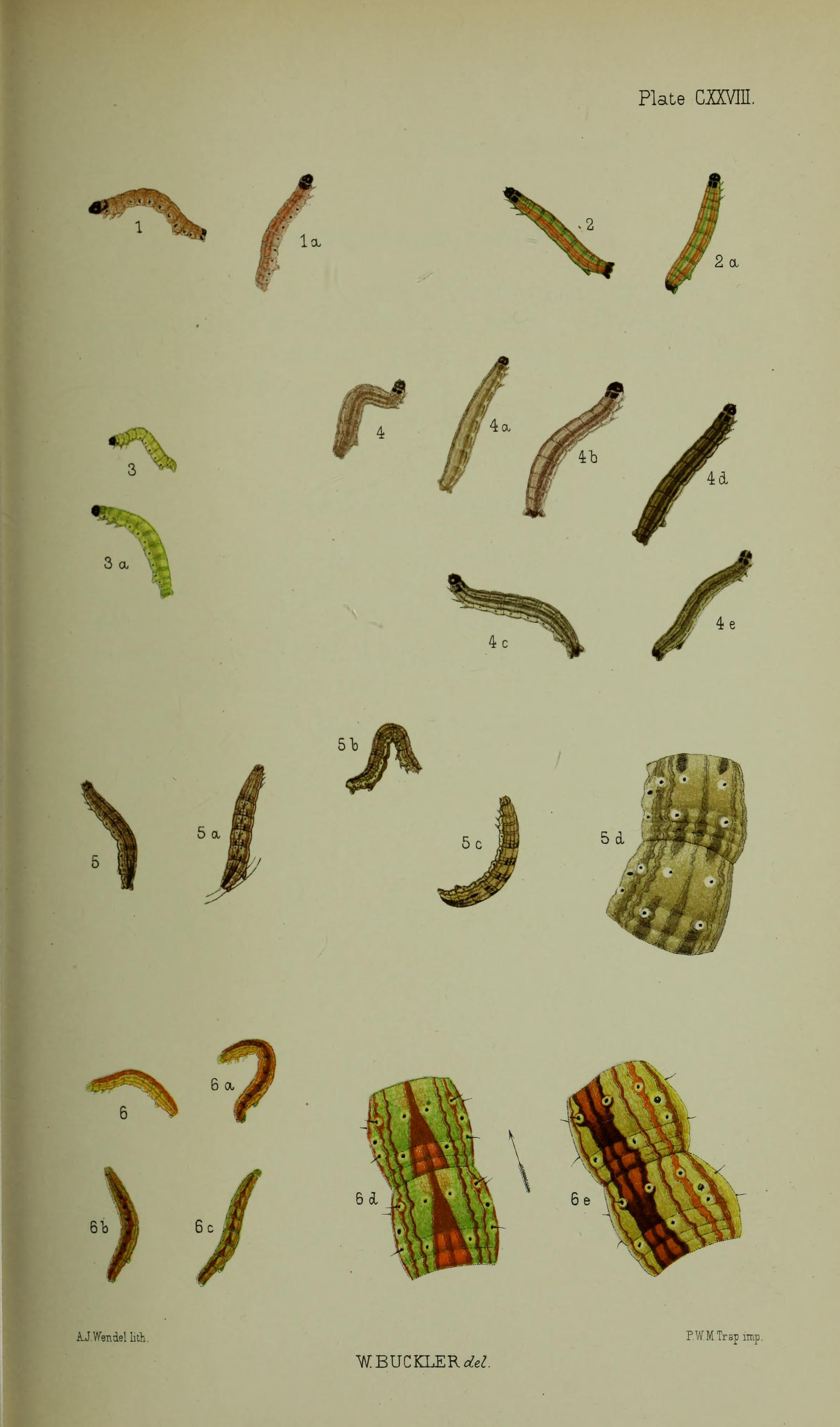
Figs.1,1a larvae after final moult

The larva is rather powerful, pale pink with a dark head capsule and the dorsal side of the first body joint.

The species is found in forest edges, hedges and on flower meadows. The larvae feed on Silene species, including Silene dioica. The larvae can be found from June to September. The species overwinters as a pupa.
