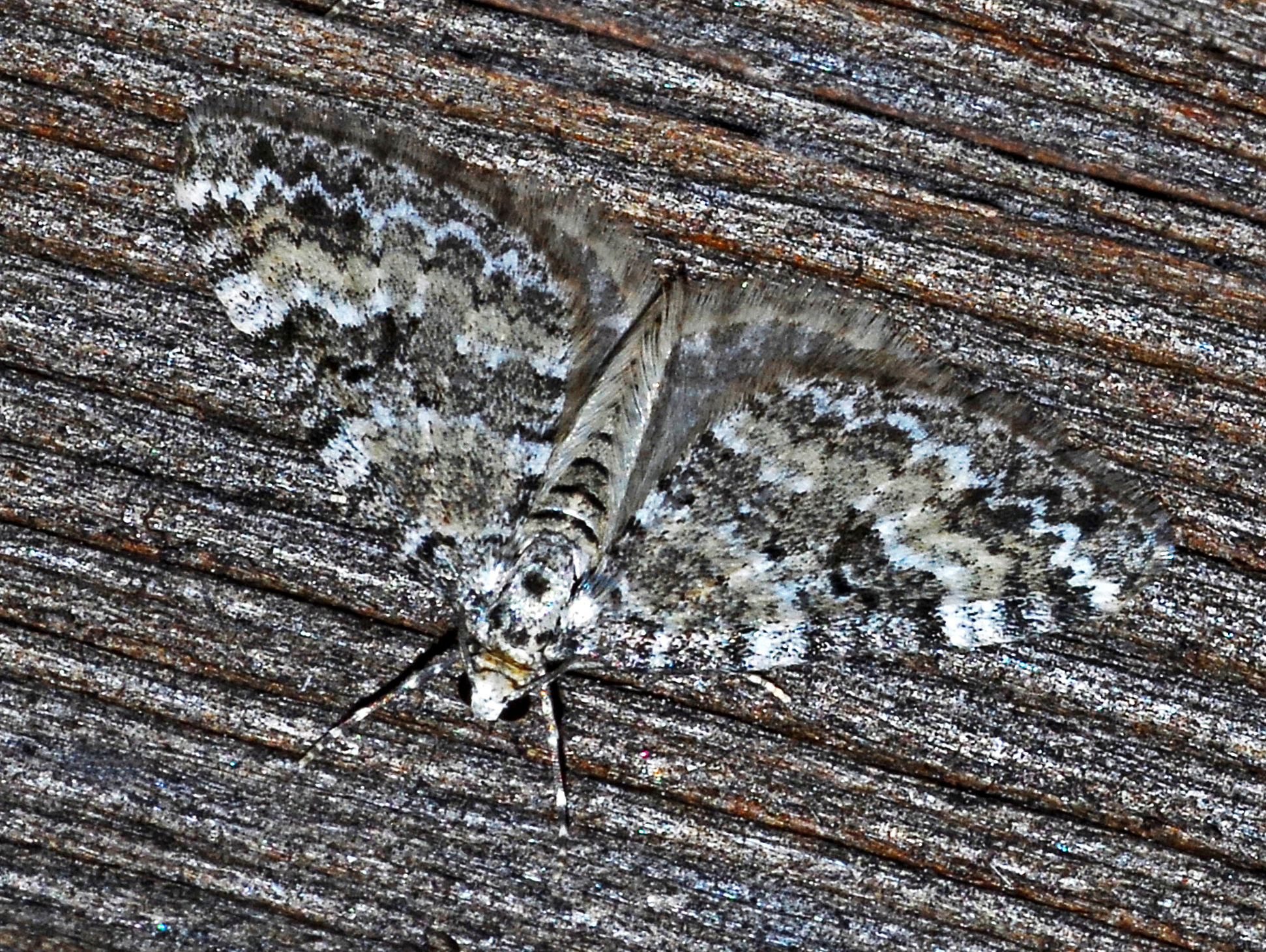

Scientific classification
- Kingdom: Animalia
- Phylum: Arthropoda
- Class: Insecta
- Order: Lepidoptera
- Family: Geometridae
- Genus: Perizoma
- Species: P. minorata

Binomial name
- Perizoma minorata (Treitschke, 1828)

Synonyms
- Cidaria minorata Treitschke, 1828; Perizoma minoratum; Emmelesia ericetata Stephens, 1831; Perizoma norvegica Prout, 1906

= Perizoma minorata =

Species of moth

Perizoma minorata, the heath rivulet, is a moth of the family Geometridae. The species was first described by Georg Friedrich Treitschke in 1828.

== Etymology ==
The specific name minorata refers to the smaller size than the other species.

== Subspecies ==
Subspecies include:

- Perizoma minorata minorata
- Perizoma minorata ericetata Stephens, 1831
- Perizoma minorata norvegica Prout, 1906

== Distribution and habitat ==
This species can be found in most of Europe. These mesophilic moths mainly occur in moorland and other woody upland areas, mountain meadows, bushy forest edges, forest bogs, heaths and stony slopes, at an elevation of 400–2,300 metres (1,300–7,500 ft) above sea level.

== Description ==
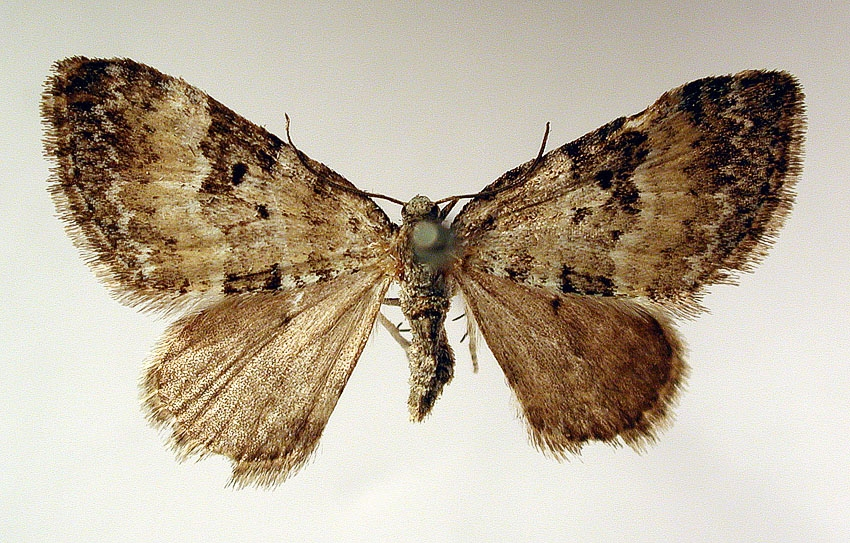
Mounted specimen

Perizoma minorata has a wingspan of 16–20 mm. It is an inconstant species and shows some local and some individual variation.

The name-typical form, as it occurs in the Alps, the mountains of Germany, Austria, southern France, etc., is the larger, paler race, the ground colour being clear white, the markings often pale, the distal area at times with only quite weak dark shading. Hindwing are whitish or very pale grey.

The subspecies Perizoma minorata ericetata, the only form known from Scotland, is considerably smaller, darker marked, the white band - distally to the median generally with a sharper dividing line, the hindwings are darker grey.

The subspecies Perizoma norvegica, from Norway, is as small as P. m. ericetata but otherwise forms a strong contrast to it, being more weakly marked than the name-type. At last P. m. ab. monticola Strand is a rare aberration, with the median area not darkened at all, but only indicated by the lines which limit it. Mentioned from Norway and Scotland.

== Biology ==
There is one generation per year with adults on wing from the end of June to August. This moth usually flies during the day, with preference for sunny afternoons.

The larvae feed on Euphrasia species. They feed on the developing seeds. The larvae can be found from August to September. This species overwinters as a pupa in the ground.

== Bibliography ==
- Merzheevskaya, O. I.; Litvinova, A. N. & Molchanova, R. V. (1976). "Tsheshuyekrylye (Lepidoptera) Belorussii". Katalog. Minsk. 131 pp.
- Mironov, V. (2003). The Geometrid Moths of Europe, vol. 4 (Larentiinae: Perizomini & Eupitheciini). in Apollo Books, Stenstrup, 464 pp. & 16 colour pls.
- Lastuvka, Z. (1998). Seznam motylu Ceske a Slovenske republiky. [Checklist of Lepidoptera of the Czech and Slovak Republics (Insecta, Lepidoptera)]. Konvoj, Brno, 117 pp.
- Pinker, R. (1968). Die Lepidopterenfauna Mazedoniens III Geometridae. in Posebno Izdanie. Prirodonaucen Muzej Skopje 4: 1-71.
