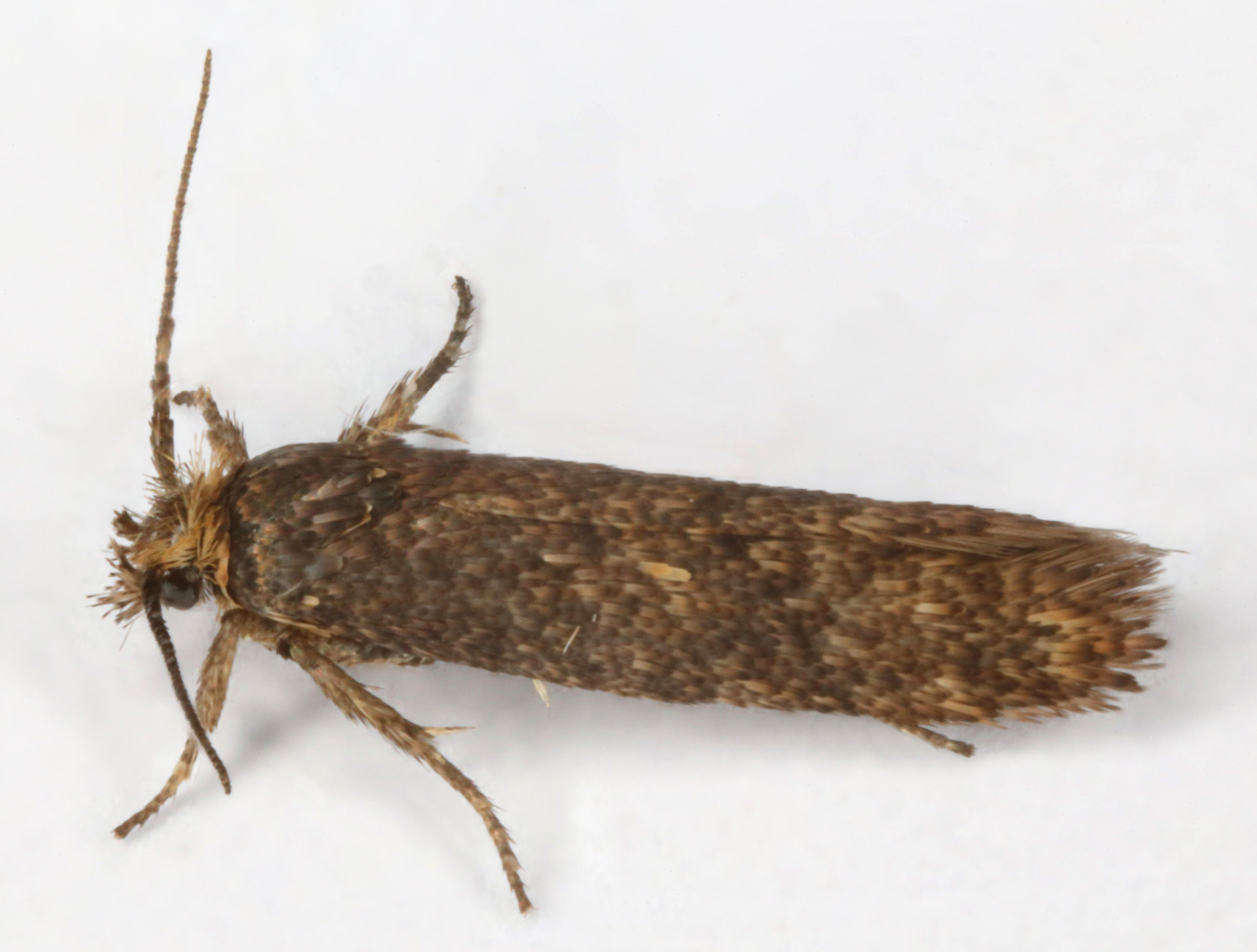

Scientific classification
- Kingdom: Animalia
- Phylum: Arthropoda
- Class: Insecta
- Order: Lepidoptera
- Family: Ypsolophidae
- Genus: Ochsenheimeria
- Species: O. urella

Binomial name
- Ochsenheimeria urella Fischer von Röslerstamm, 1842

Synonyms
- Ochsenheimeria bisontella Lienig & Zeller, 1846; Ochsenheimeria scabrosella Tengström, 1848; Ochsenheimeria hirculella Tengström, 1848; Ochsenheimeria porpyrella Tengström, 1848; Ypsolophus taurellus Haworth, 1828; Ochsenheimeria rupicaprella Mobius, 1935

= Ochsenheimeria urella =

Species of moth

Ochsenheimeria urella is a moth of the family Ypsolophidae. It is found in large parts of Europe, except the Iberian Peninsula, most of the Balkan Peninsula, Ukraine and Lithuania.

The wingspan is 9–12 mm. Antennae in male hardly, in female rather strongly thickened with rough scales to above middle. Forewings narrower than in Ochsenheimeria taurella, in male rather dark fuscous, in female greyish-ochreous more or less mixed with fuscous. Hindwings are brassy-purplish-fuscous, thinly scaled towards base.

Adults are on wing in July and August.

The larvae feed on Agropyron, Bromus, Hordeum vulgare, Melica, Secale cereale and Triticum aestivum. They possibly mine the leaves of their host plant for a few days. Later, they bore in the stems. Larvae can be found from April to May.
