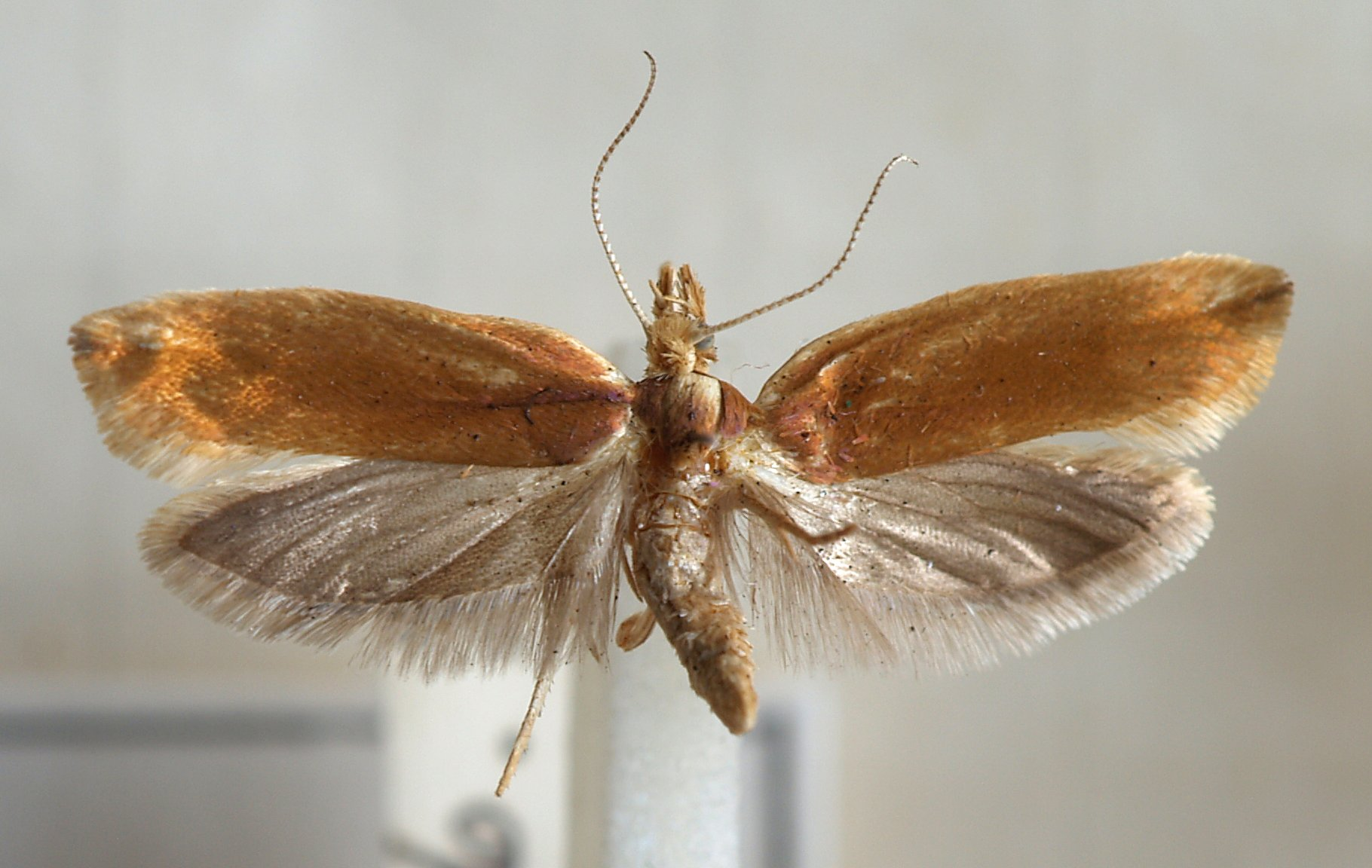

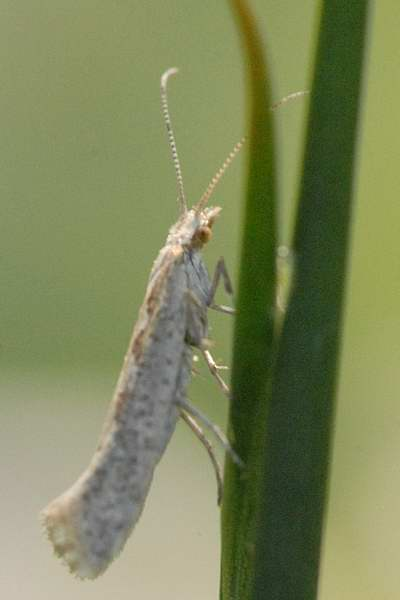

Scientific classification
- Kingdom: Animalia
- Phylum: Arthropoda
- Clade: Pancrustacea
- Class: Insecta
- Order: Lepidoptera
- Family: Ypsolophidae
- Genus: Ypsolopha
- Species: Y. ustella

Binomial name
- Ypsolopha ustella (Clerck, 1759)

Synonyms
- Phalaena ustella Clerck, 1759; Phalaena radiatella Donovan, 1794; Ypsolopha quinquepunctatus Haworth, 1828; Ypsolopha lutosus Haworth, 1828; Ypsolopha flaviciliatus Haworth, 1828; Ypsolopha rufimitrella Stephens, 1834; Ypsolopha variella (Hübner, 1796); Ypsolopha fissella (Hübner, 1796); Ypsolopha lutarella (Hübner, 1796); Ypsolopha byssinella (Hübner, 1810-13); Ypsolopha unitella (Treitschke, 1833); Ypsolopha fulvella (Duponchel, 1838); Ypsolopha ochrella (Chambers, 1880)

= Ypsolopha ustella =

Variable ypsolopha moth

Species of moth

Ypsolopha ustella, the variable ypsolopha moth, is a moth of the family Ypsolophidae. It is found in most of Europe and is also present in North America.

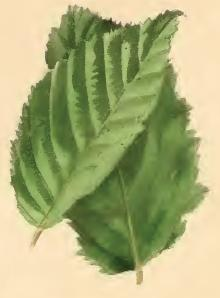
Two leaves of hornbeam fastened together by larva

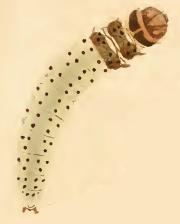
Larva

The wingspan is 15–20 mm. It is a variable species with numerous colour forms. Meyrick describes it - Head ferruginous ochreous or grey. Forewings narrower than in Ypsolopha parenthesella, pale grey or pale greyish-ochreous to deep ferruginous-ochreons or dark bronzy; sometimes several small darker spots, or indistinct longitudinal streaks of whitish irroration, or a dark fuscous median longitudinal streak from base to apex; a dark fuscous dot above tornus; a costal patch of thickened membrane between 11 and 12. Hindwings are grey. The larva is green; spots darker.

Adults are on wing from mid-July to April in western Europe, but can be on wing nearly year round depending on the location. The species overwinters as an adult.

The larvae feed on the upperside of the leaves of Quercus species.
