= Ochsenheimeria glabratella =

Scientific classification
- Domain: Eukaryota
- Kingdom: Animalia
- Phylum: Arthropoda
- Class: Insecta
- Order: Lepidoptera
- Family: Ypsolophidae
- Genus: Ochsenheimeria
- Species: O. glabratella

Binomial name
- Ochsenheimeria glabratella Muller-Rutz, 1914

Species of moth

Ochsenheimeria glabratella is a moth of the family Ypsolophidae. It is found in Germany, France, Switzerland, Austria and Italy.

The wingspan is 9–11 mm (0.35–0.43 in).
