= Ochsenheimeria capella =

Scientific classification
- Domain: Eukaryota
- Kingdom: Animalia
- Phylum: Arthropoda
- Class: Insecta
- Order: Lepidoptera
- Family: Ypsolophidae
- Genus: Ochsenheimeria
- Species: O. capella

Binomial name
- Ochsenheimeria capella Moschler, 1860

Synonyms
- Aridomeria capella

Species of moth

Ochsenheimeria capella is a moth of the family Ypsolophidae. It is found in Hungary and from Russia to northern Kazakhstan.

The wingspan is about 10 mm.

The larvae feed on Secale cereale, Setaria italica and Stipa species. They probably mine the leaves of their host plant for about a week. The larva then continues feeding as a stem borer.
