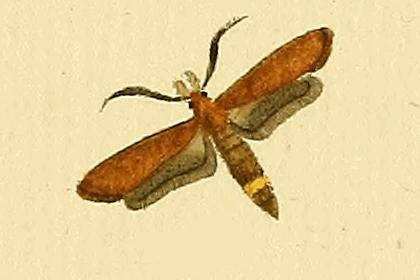

Scientific classification
- Kingdom: Animalia
- Phylum: Arthropoda
- Class: Insecta
- Order: Lepidoptera
- Family: Ypsolophidae
- Genus: Ochsenheimeria
- Species: O. bubalella

Binomial name
- Ochsenheimeria bubalella (Hubner, 1813)

Synonyms
- Tinea bubalella Hubner, 1813

= Ochsenheimeria bubalella =

Species of moth

Ochsenheimeria bubalella is a moth of the family Ypsolophidae. It is found in southern France and Spain.

The larvae feed on Juncus and Scirpus species. They bore the stem of their host plant.
