= Ochsenheimeria lovyi =

Scientific classification
- Domain: Eukaryota
- Kingdom: Animalia
- Phylum: Arthropoda
- Class: Insecta
- Order: Lepidoptera
- Family: Ypsolophidae
- Genus: Ochsenheimeria
- Species: O. lovyi

Binomial name
- Ochsenheimeria lovyi Dumont, 1930

Species of moth

Ochsenheimeria lovyi is a moth of the family Ypsolophidae. It is found in Tunisia.

The larvae feed on Juncus maritimus.
