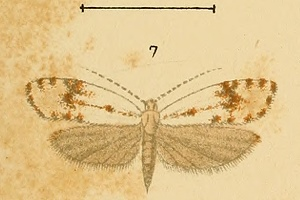

Scientific classification
- Domain: Eukaryota
- Kingdom: Animalia
- Phylum: Arthropoda
- Class: Insecta
- Order: Lepidoptera
- Family: Ypsolophidae
- Genus: Phrealcia
- Species: P. eximiella

Binomial name
- Phrealcia eximiella (Rebel, 1899)

Synonyms
- Calantica eximiella Rebel, 1899; Phrealcia brevipalpella Chrétien, 1900; Procalantica eximiella Rebel, 1901; Phrealcia eximiella Rebel, 1907

= Phrealcia eximiella =

Species of moth

Phrealcia eximiella is a species of moth of the family Ypsolophidae. It is found in Spain, France, Italy, Austria and Switzerland.

The wingspan is 16.5–17.5 mm (0.65–0.69 in).
