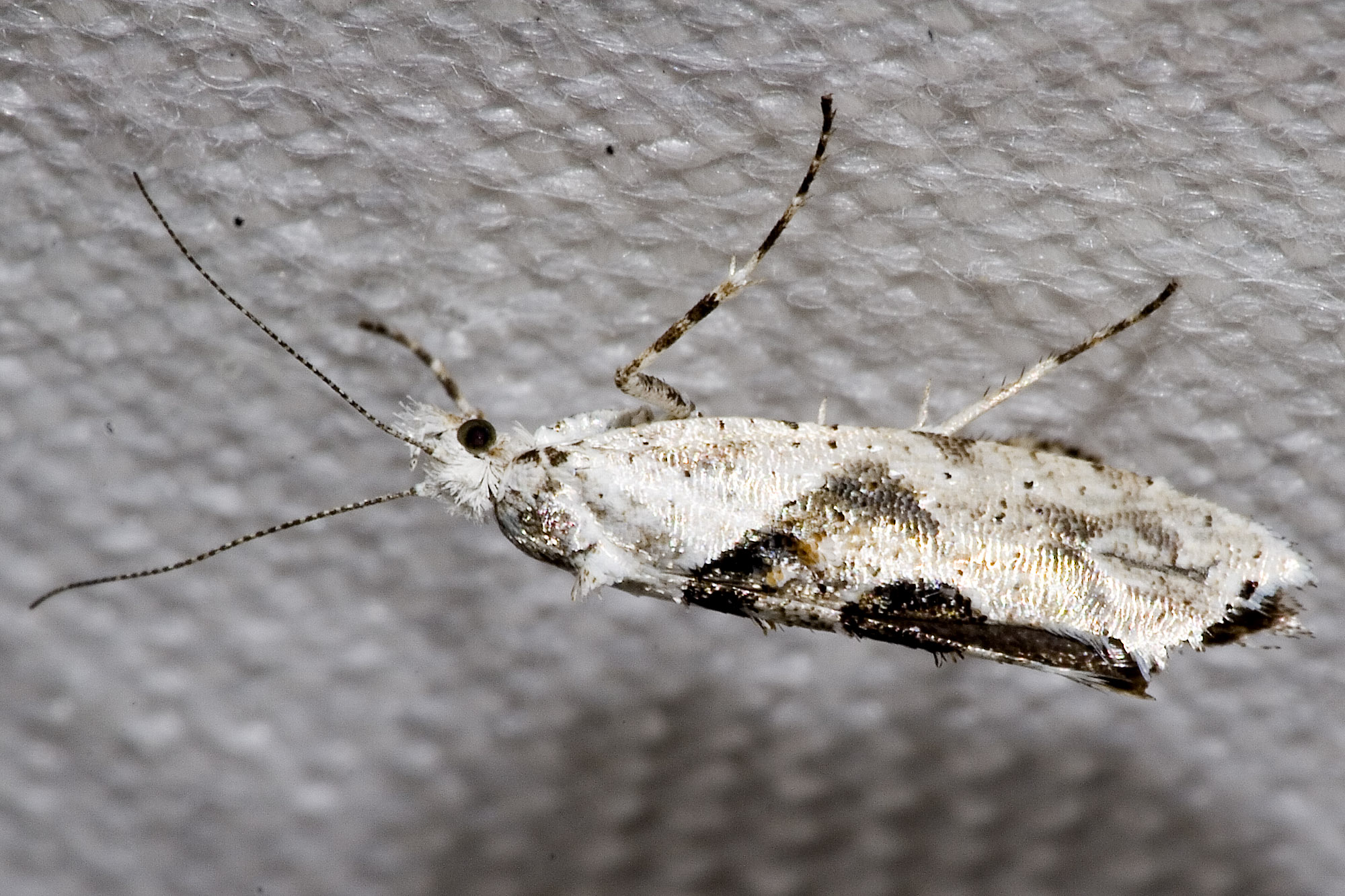

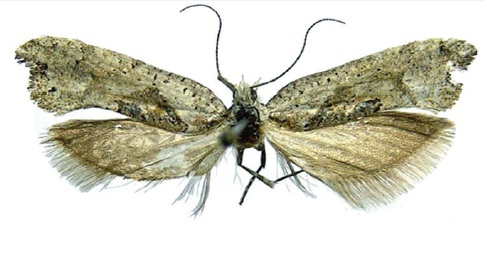

Scientific classification
- Kingdom: Animalia
- Phylum: Arthropoda
- Clade: Pancrustacea
- Class: Insecta
- Order: Lepidoptera
- Family: Ypsolophidae
- Genus: Ypsolopha
- Species: Y. asperella

Binomial name
- Ypsolopha asperella (Linnaeus, 1761)

Synonyms
- Phalaena (Tinea) asperella Linnaeus, 1761; Ypsolophus clairvillella Fabricius, 1798; Phalaena falcatella Donovan, 1802; Cerostoma falculella Erschoff, 1877; Ypsolopha falculellus

= Ypsolopha asperella =

Species of moth

Ypsolopha asperella is a moth of the family Ypsolophidae. It is found in Northern and Central Europe, Siberia, Korea, China, Asia Minor and Mideast Asia.

The wingspan is 20–21 mm. The larvae feed on apple, Crataegus, Cerasus, Pyrus, Armeniaca, Persica and Prunus species (including Prunus sargentii).
