= Ochsenheimeria hugginsi =

Scientific classification
- Domain: Eukaryota
- Kingdom: Animalia
- Phylum: Arthropoda
- Class: Insecta
- Order: Lepidoptera
- Family: Ypsolophidae
- Genus: Ochsenheimeria
- Species: O. hugginsi

Binomial name
- Ochsenheimeria hugginsi Bradley, 1953

Species of moth

Ochsenheimeria hugginsi is a moth of the family Ypsolophidae. It is found in the central Himalayas in India.
