= Phrealcia steueri =

Scientific classification
- Kingdom: Animalia
- Phylum: Arthropoda
- Clade: Pancrustacea
- Class: Insecta
- Order: Lepidoptera
- Family: Ypsolophidae
- Genus: Phrealcia
- Species: P. steueri

Binomial name
- Phrealcia steueri Mey, 2012

Species of moth

Phrealcia steueri is a species of moth of the family Ypsolophidae. It is found in Xinjiang, China.
