= Ochsenheimeria kisilkuma =

Scientific classification
- Domain: Eukaryota
- Kingdom: Animalia
- Phylum: Arthropoda
- Class: Insecta
- Order: Lepidoptera
- Family: Ypsolophidae
- Genus: Ochsenheimeria
- Species: O. kisilkuma

Binomial name
- Ochsenheimeria kisilkuma Zagulajev, 1966

Species of moth

Ochsenheimeria kisilkuma is a moth of the family Ypsolophidae. It is found in the Kyzyl Kum desert in Uzbekistan.
