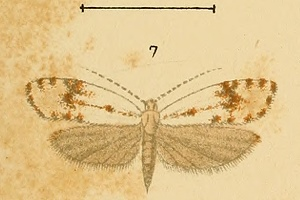
- Phrealcia eximiella

Scientific classification
- Domain: Eukaryota
- Kingdom: Animalia
- Phylum: Arthropoda
- Class: Insecta
- Order: Lepidoptera
- Family: Ypsolophidae
- Subfamily: Ypsolophinae
- Genus: Phrealcia; Chrétien, 1900

= Phrealcia =

Genus of moths

Phrealcia is a genus of moths of the family Ypsolophidae.

== Species ==
- Phrealcia brevipalpella Chrétien, 1900
- Phrealcia eximiella (Rebel, 1899)
- Phrealcia friesei Mey, 2012
- Phrealcia steueri Mey, 2012
- Phrealcia ussuriensis Rebel, 1901
