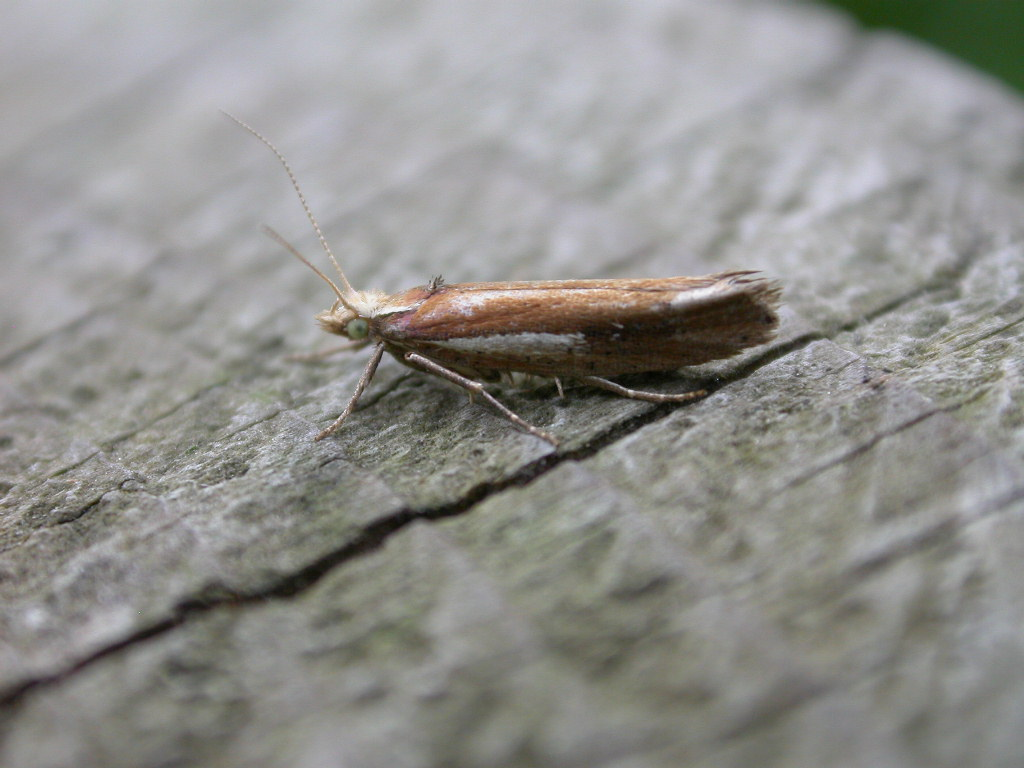

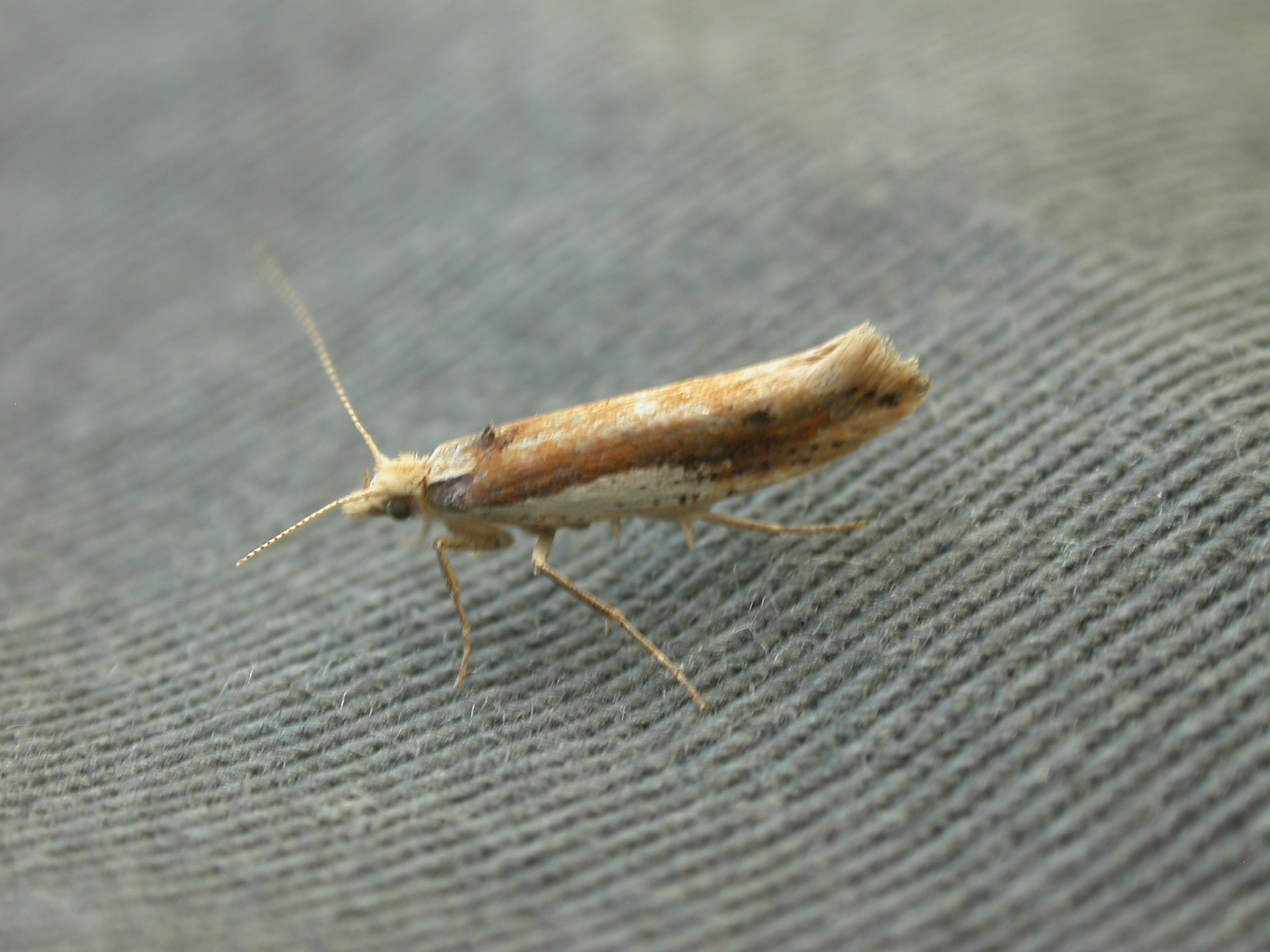

Scientific classification
- Kingdom: Animalia
- Phylum: Arthropoda
- Class: Insecta
- Order: Lepidoptera
- Family: Ypsolophidae
- Genus: Ypsolopha
- Species: Y. parenthesella

Binomial name
- Ypsolopha parenthesella (Linnaeus, 1761)

Synonyms
- Phalaena parenthesella Linnaeus, 1761; Alucita costella Fabricius, 1775

= Ypsolopha parenthesella =

Species of moth

Ypsolopha parenthesella is a moth of the family Ypsolophidae. It is found from Europe to Japan, as well as north-eastern China, Asia Minor and mideast Asia.

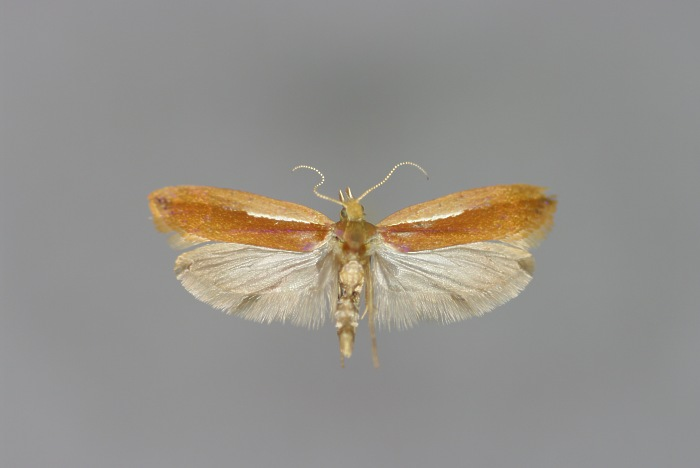

The wingspan is 16–20 mm.Head white or ochreous-whitish. Forewings pale or rather deep golden-ochreous, with scattered blackish strigulae, sometimes much suffused with dark bronzy-fuscous; usually a white longitudinal blotch extending along or beneath basal half of costa; a blackish dot above tornus, and another at apex.Hindwings grey.Larva yellowish-green; subdorsal line slender, yellowish; dots black; head brownish. It is a variable species, especially in wing pattern and colour.

Adults are on wing from August to September. The larvae feed on various trees, including Quercus, Fagus, Fraxinus, Populus, Carpinus (including Carpinus betulus), Crataegus, Malus, Betula and Corylus avellana.
