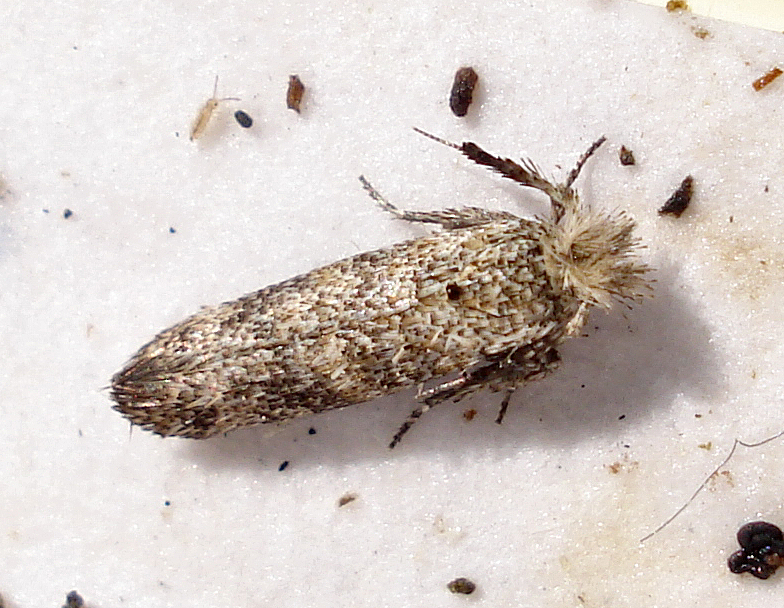
- Ochsenheimeria taurella
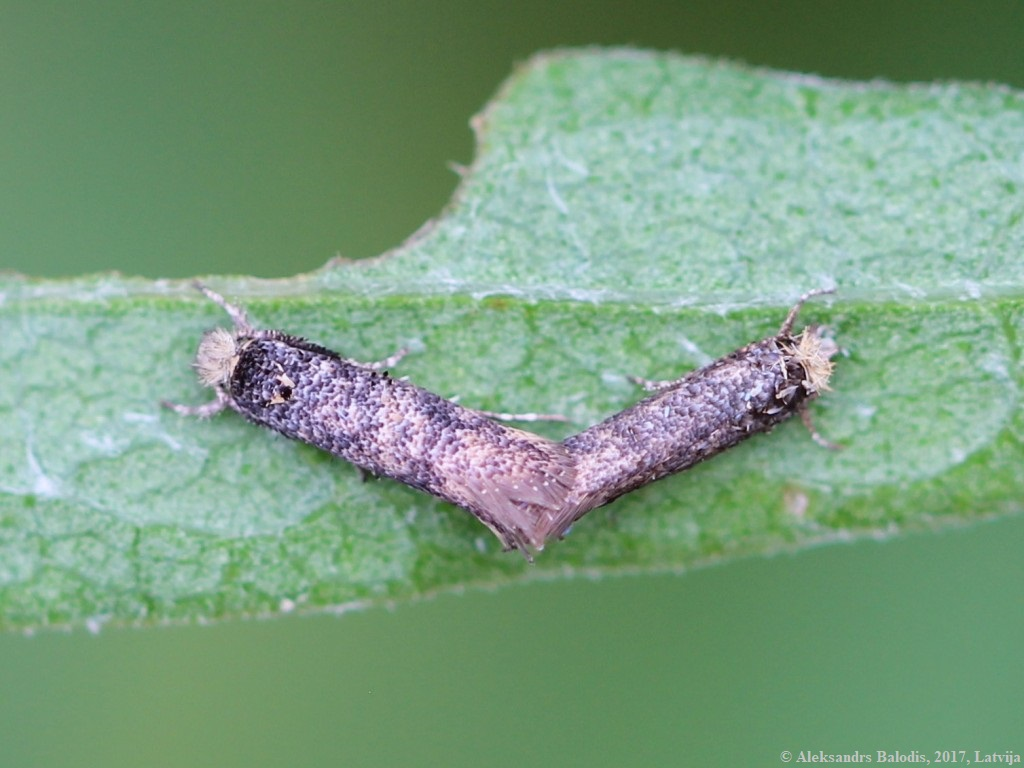
- Ochsenheimeria urella

Scientific classification
- Kingdom: Animalia
- Phylum: Arthropoda
- Clade: Pancrustacea
- Class: Insecta
- Order: Lepidoptera
- Family: Ypsolophidae
- Genus: Ochsenheimeria; Hübner, 1825

Synonyms
- Lepidocera Curtis, 1831; Phygas Treitschke, 1833; Aridomeria Zagulajev, 1988

= Ochsenheimeria =

Genus of moths

Ochsenheimeria is a genus of moths that belongs to the family Ypsolophidae. They can be found only in the Palearctic realm including Europe, central Russia, India, the Middle East and North Africa.

There are only three monocot families are known to be host for Ochsenheimeria larvae. They are Cyperaceae (sedges) and Juncaceae (rushes) and Poaceae (true grasses). These families have varying importance as host of their larvae. Juncaceae have a relatively minor with only Ochsenheimeria bubalella and Ochsenheimeria lovyi having been found attacking these plants. Poaceae have a much greater importance for this genus with a variety of grasses acting as host with Bromus (brome grasses), Secale and Triticum (wheat) species being especially preferred.

== Taxonomy ==
The genus was described in 1825 by Jacob Hübner, a German entomologist known for writing founding work on entomology such as Sammlung Europäischer Schmetterlinge.

=== Species ===
- Ochsenheimeria algeriella Zagulajev, 1966
- Ochsenheimeria bubalella (Hübner, 1813)
- Ochsenheimeria capella Möschler, 1860
- Ochsenheimeria glabratella Müller-Rutz, 1914
- Ochsenheimeria hugginsi Bradley, 1953
- Ochsenheimeria kisilkuma Zagulajev, 1966
- Ochsenheimeria lovyi Dumont, 1930
- Ochsenheimeria taurella (Denis & Schiffermüller, 1775)
- Ochsenheimeria urella Fischer von Röslerstamm, 1842
- Ochsenheimeria vacculella Fischer von Röslerstamm, 1842

==== Status unknown ====
- Ochsenheimeria distinctella Zagulajev, 1972 (described from the Russian Far East)

=== Taxonomic history ===
It is the only genus within the subfamily Ochsenheimeriinae which makes the subfamily monotypic. However the family which this genus is placed in wasn’t always monotypic. Previously, there were two other genera, Lepidocera described by Curtis in 1831 and Phygas described by Treitschke in 1833. However they would be placed as a taxonomic synonym of this genus by stainton in 1854 along with Aridomeria. The genus would be proposed in 1825 by Jacob Hübner for two previously described insect species: Tinea bubalella and Tinea taurella. In 1870, the uniqueness of the genus would be recognized by Heinemann erecting the family Ochsenheimeriidae for it however several authors (Meyrick, 1928, and Kloet and Hincks, 1945) disagreed with this placement and favor the earlier grouping with Tineidae. It is now accepted that Ochsenheimeria are likely deserving of their own separate family.

Due to how unique this genus is, the taxonomic placement of Ochsenheimeria within Lepidoptera was uncertain. Perhaps on the basic to similarities with the structure of their male genitals, Real (1966) believed they were closely related to Elachistidae. In 1973, Zagulajev would consider to be Deuterotineidae due to their ecological requirements. Some considered them to be related to Tineoidea due to morphological features and particularly their wing ventelation. Today, Ochsenheimeria are considered to be members of the family Ypsolophidae.

== Distribution ==
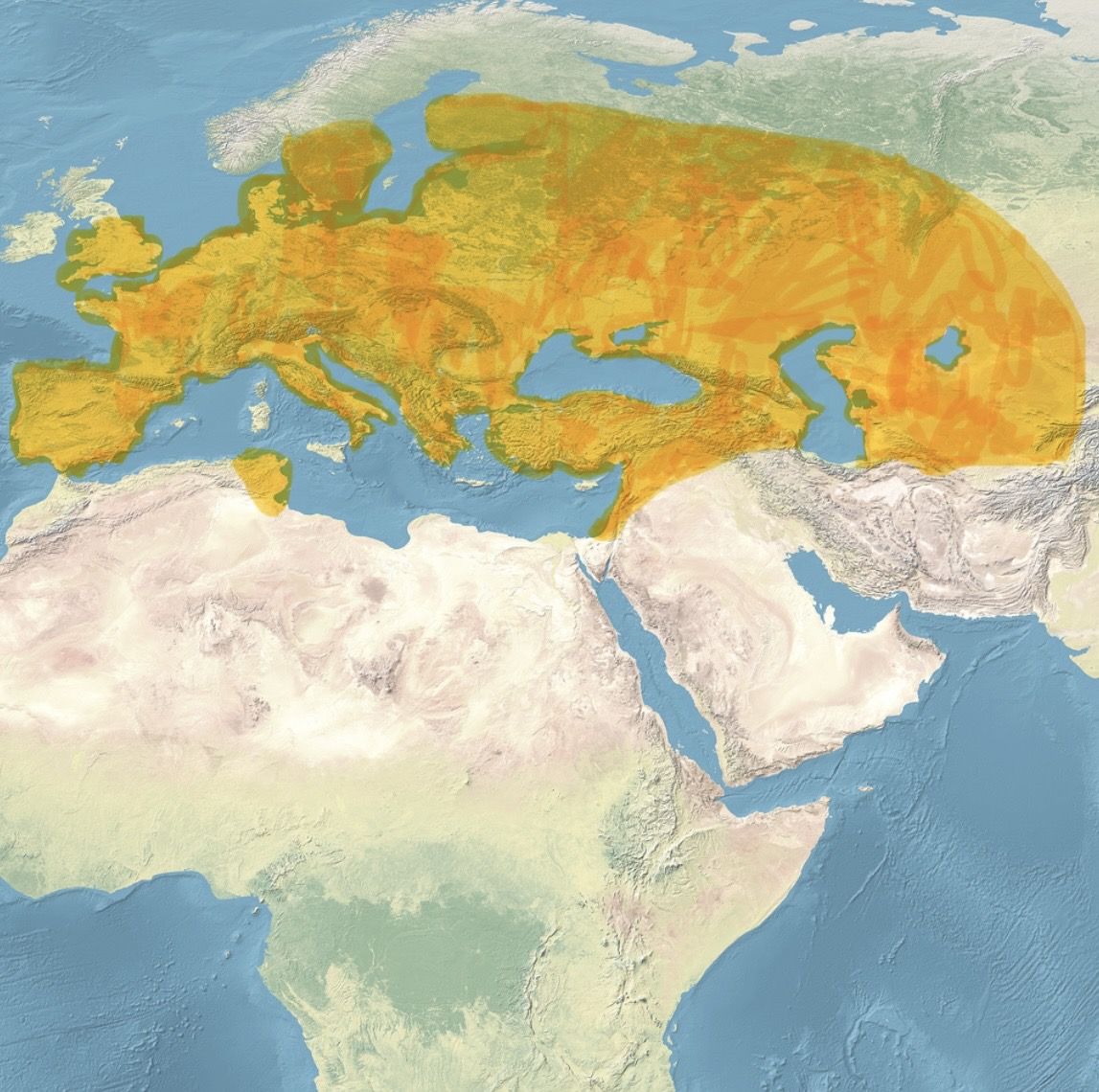
Distribution map of Ochsenheimeria

Most species are known from the Palearctic realm only between the latitudes of 30° N and 60° N. They can be found all throughout Europe occurring in Great Britain and from the Iberian Peninsula of Western Europe to Central Europe and central Russia. Only one member of the genus have been found in Primorsk of central Russia. Their range extends further east into the Middle East of Lebanon and northwestern India. They can even be found in Northern Africa in Algeria and Tunisia.

Their distribution seems to have been limited to by natural barriers such as the ocean. Their range has also been limited in Africa by the Sahara Desert and in southern Asia mainly by the Himalayas. Despite these barriers, some species are known to prefer harsh arid conditions such as Ochsenheimeria kisilkuma while some such as Ochsenheimeria hugginsi have specimens that were collected at altitudes of 4570 meters (15,000 feet). It is thought that the distribution of this genus is much more extensive, particularly in Asia. This suggests that further collecting is needed to understand more about the genus distribution. It is also possible that certain species, through accidental exposure, may have been able to establish populations in remote populations such as the grassland habitats of South Africa or the pampas grasslands of South America.

== Description ==
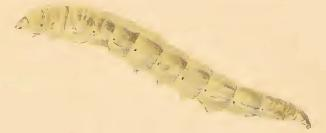
Larva of Ochsenheimeria taurella

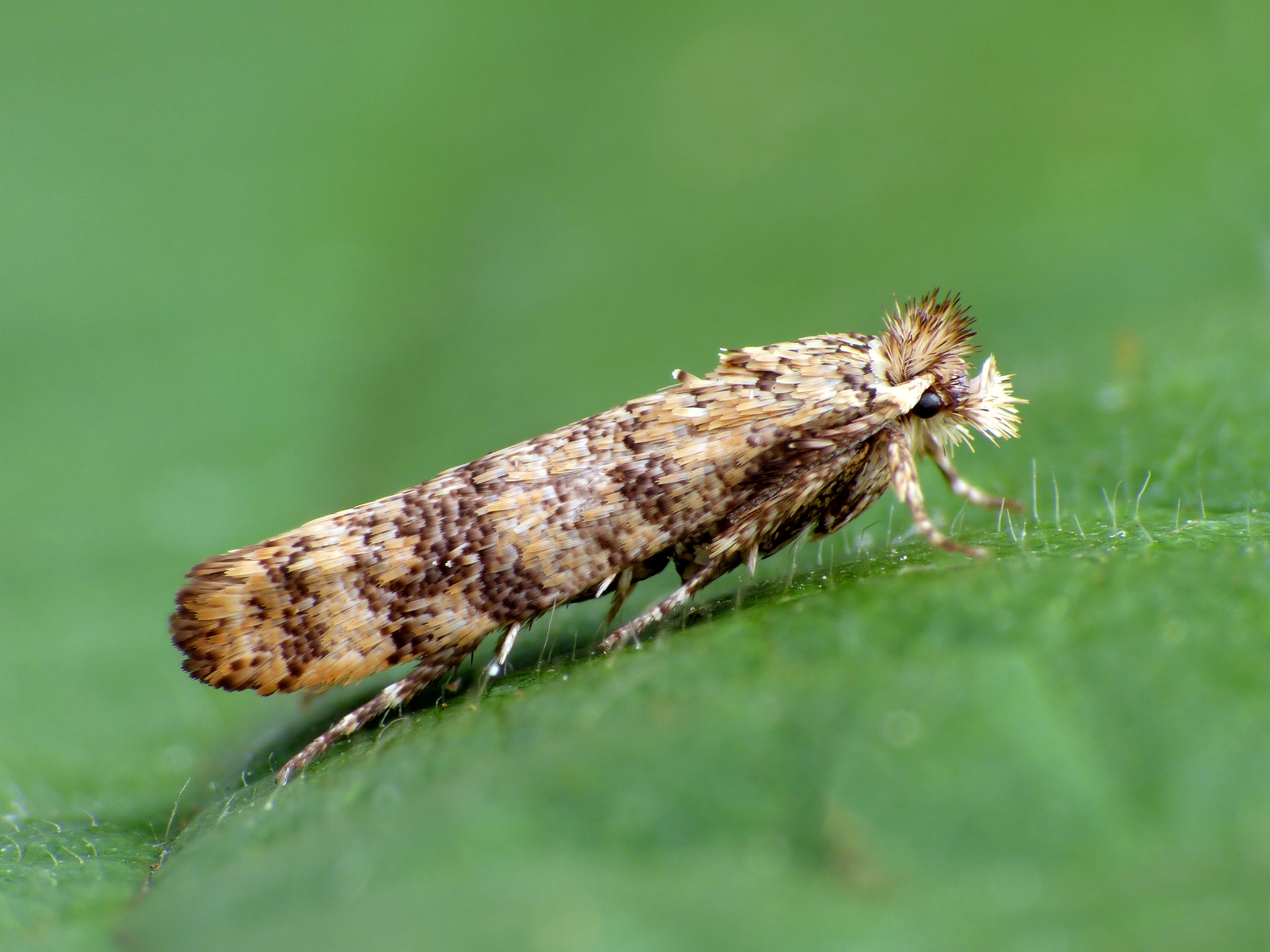
Adult Ochsenheimeria taurella

Members of this genus are small species that have slender to stout bodies. Males have a wingspan between 9-15 millimeters while females have a wingspan between 9–17 mm. Their vertex is extremely rough and are long, divergent hairlike scales. Their eyes are small and rounded. Their antennas are short and simple.

== Sources ==
- Davis, Donald R., 1975: Review of Ochsenheimeriidae and the introduction of the Ceral Stem Moth Ochsenheimeria vacculella into the United States (Lepidoptera: Tineoidea). Smithsonian Contributions to Zoology 192: 1-20.
