= Rhabdocosma aglaophanes =

Scientific classification
- Kingdom: Animalia
- Phylum: Arthropoda
- Class: Insecta
- Order: Lepidoptera
- Family: Ypsolophidae
- Genus: Rhabdocosma
- Species: R. aglaophanes

Binomial name
- Rhabdocosma aglaophanes Meyrick, 1935

Species of moth

Rhabdocosma aglaophanes is a moth of the family Ypsolophidae. It is found in Japan.

The wingspan is 14–18 mm.

Larvae feed on Celastraceae species.
