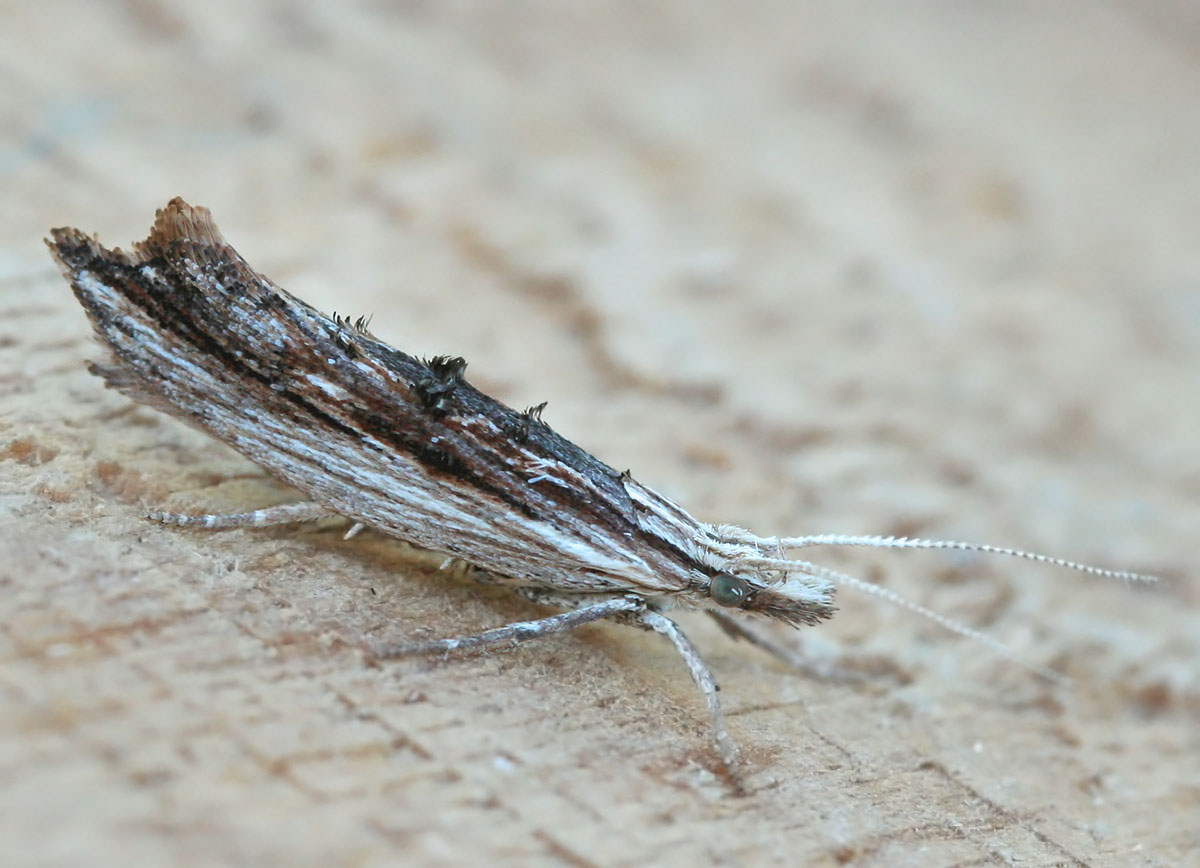

Scientific classification
- Kingdom: Animalia
- Phylum: Arthropoda
- Class: Insecta
- Order: Lepidoptera
- Family: Ypsolophidae
- Genus: Ypsolopha
- Species: Y. scabrella

Binomial name
- Ypsolopha scabrella (Linnaeus, 1761)

= Ypsolopha scabrella =

Species of moth

Ypsolopha scabrella, the wainscot hooktip or wainscot smudge, is a moth of the family Ypsolophidae. The species was first described by Carl Linnaeus in 1761. It is found in Europe, China, Russia, Asia Minor and mideast Asia.

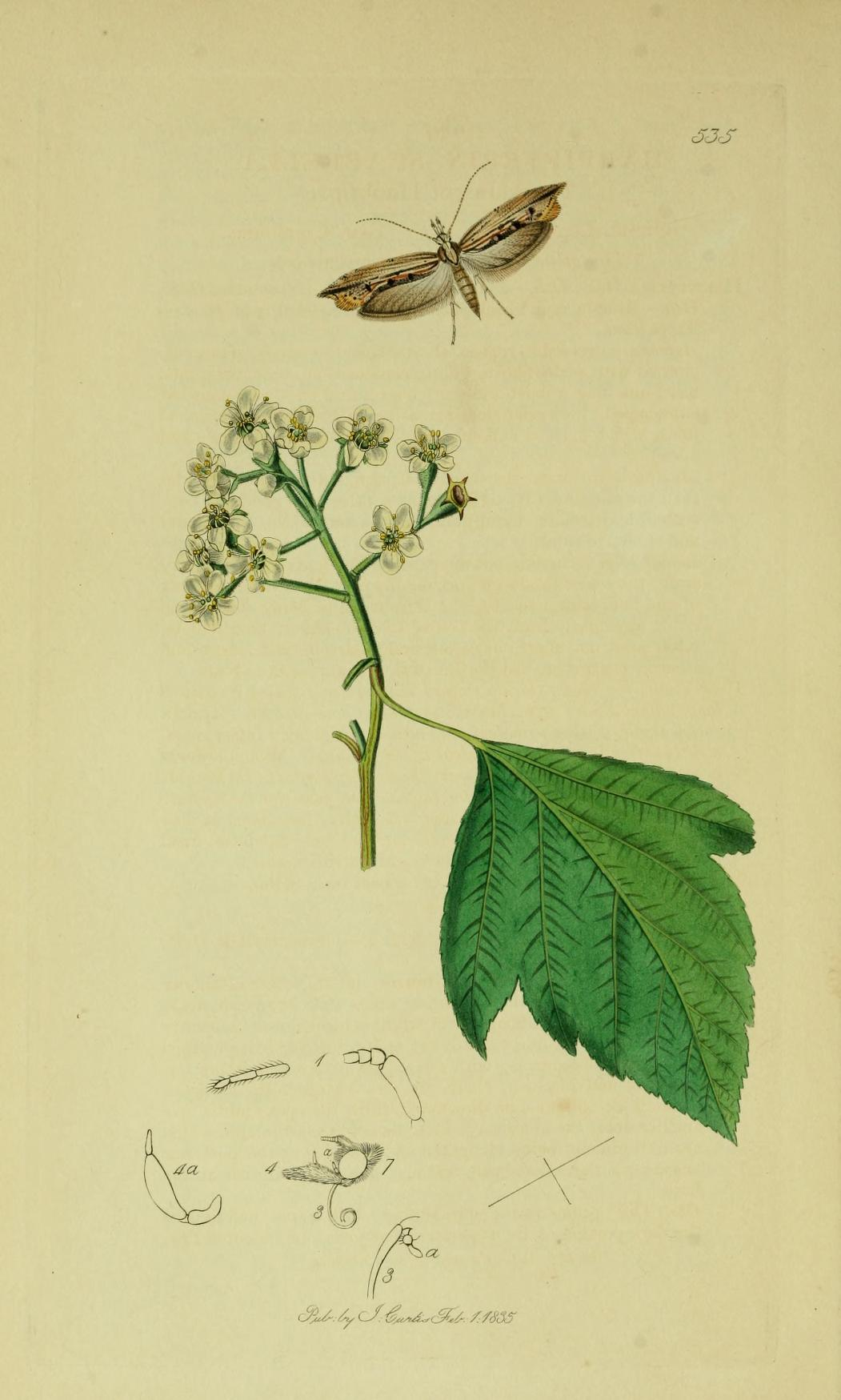
Illustration from John Curtis's British Entomology Volume 6

The wingspan is 20–22 mm. The head and thorax are whitish, streaked with dark fuscous. Forewings with apex acutely produced; whitish, more or less sprinkled with light purplish fuscous and black, veins ferruginous-brown; dorsal half more or less wholly suffused with dark purplish-fuscous, with one or two black streaks, a dorsal streak darker; three blackish scale tufts below fold and one above tornus. Hindwings are light grey, darker posteriorly. The larva is green: dorsal line broad, white; dots black.

The moth flies from July to September depending on the location.

The larvae feed on apple, Crataegus and Cotoneaster.
