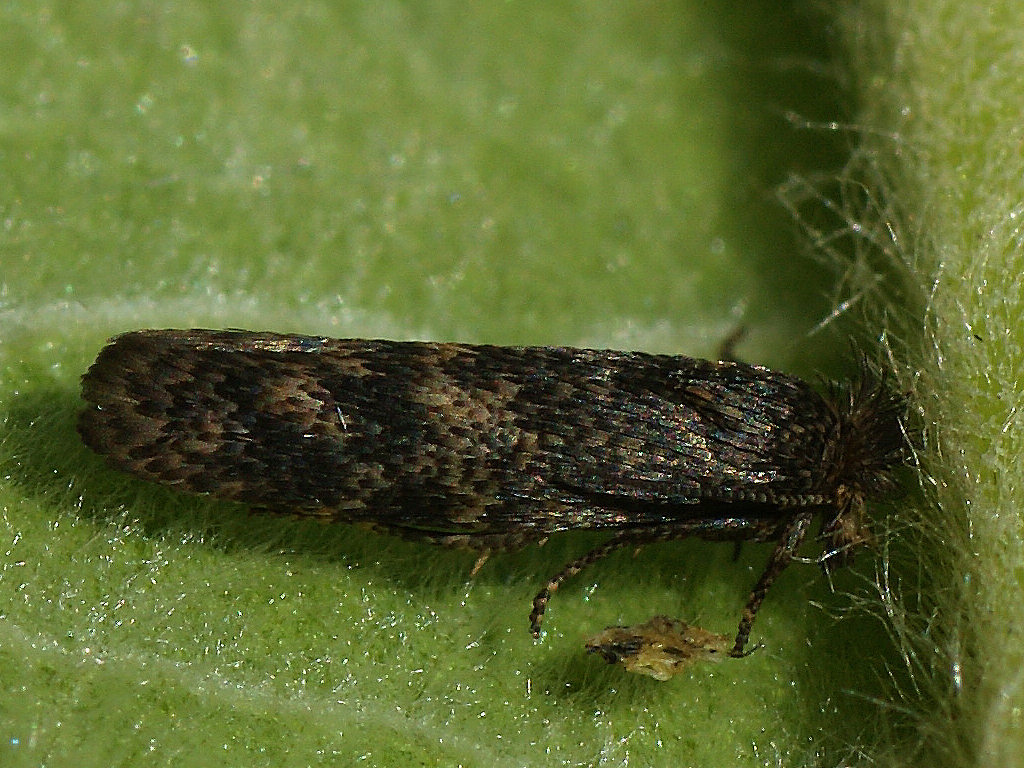

Scientific classification
- Kingdom: Animalia
- Phylum: Arthropoda
- Class: Insecta
- Order: Lepidoptera
- Family: Ypsolophidae
- Genus: Ochsenheimeria
- Species: O. vacculella

Binomial name
- Ochsenheimeria vacculella Fischer von Röslerstamm, 1842

Synonyms
- Ochsenheimeria danilevskii Zagulajev, 1972

= Ochsenheimeria vacculella =

Cereal stem moth

Species of moth

Ochsenheimeria vacculella, the cereal stem moth, is a moth of the family Ypsolophidae. It is found in most of Europe, except Ireland, Norway, Portugal, Italy and most of the Balkan Peninsula. The species was accidentally introduced into parts of the United States.

The wingspan is 11–14 mm (0.43–0.55 in). Adults are on wing in July and August.

The larvae feed on plants including Agropyron cristatum, Elymus caninus, Elymus repens, Bromus erectus, Bromus inermis, Festuca pratensis, Lolium, Phleum pratense, Poa, Secale cereale and Triticum aestivum. They can be found from April to May.
