= Rhabdocosma dolini =

Scientific classification
- Kingdom: Animalia
- Phylum: Arthropoda
- Class: Insecta
- Order: Lepidoptera
- Family: Ypsolophidae
- Genus: Rhabdocosma
- Species: R. dolini

Binomial name
- Rhabdocosma dolini Gershenson, 2001

Species of moth

Rhabdocosma dolini is a moth of the family Ypsolophidae. It is only known from Madagascar.

The wingspan is about 16 mm.
