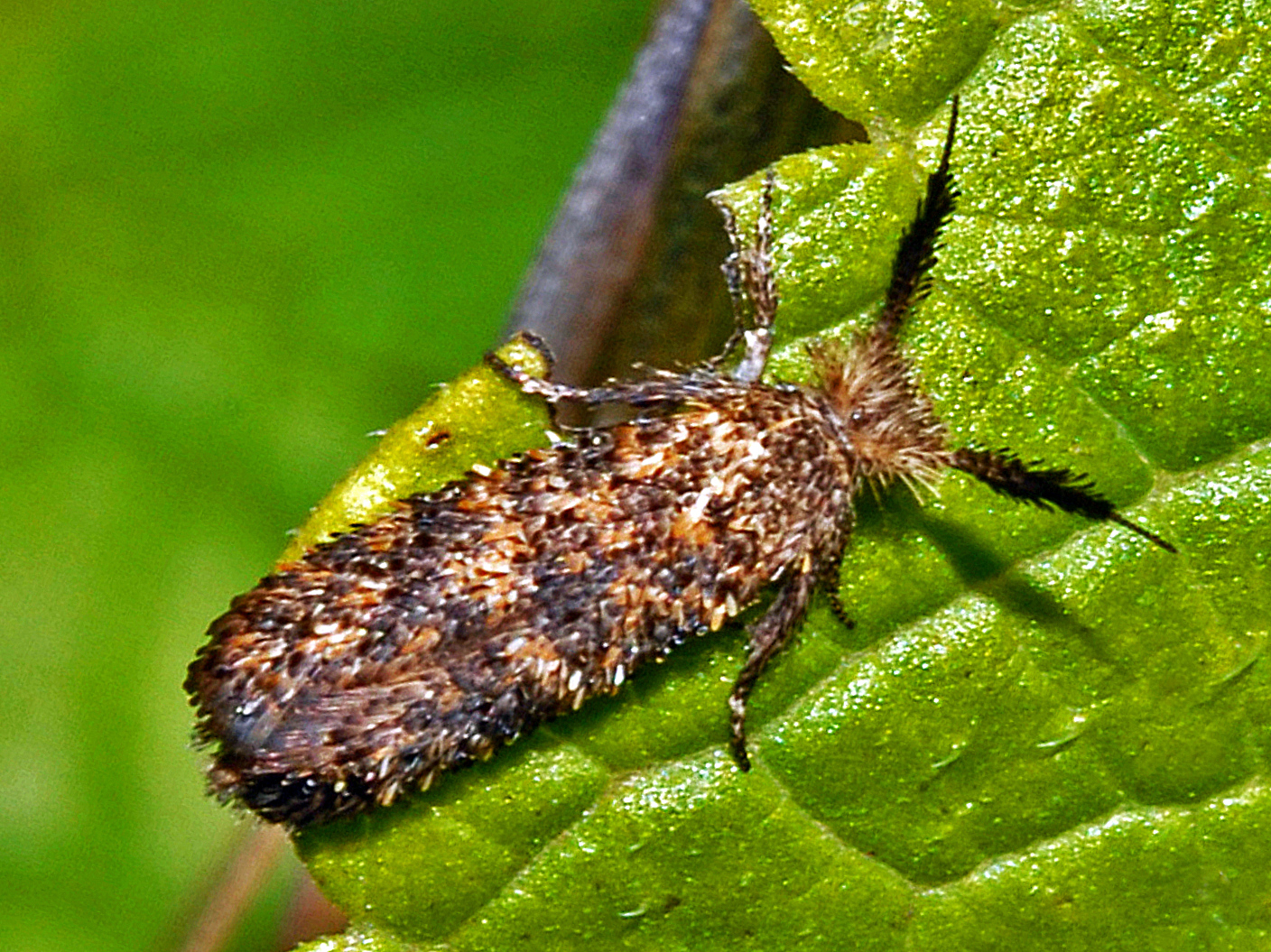
- Ochsenheimeria taurella. Female, dorsal view
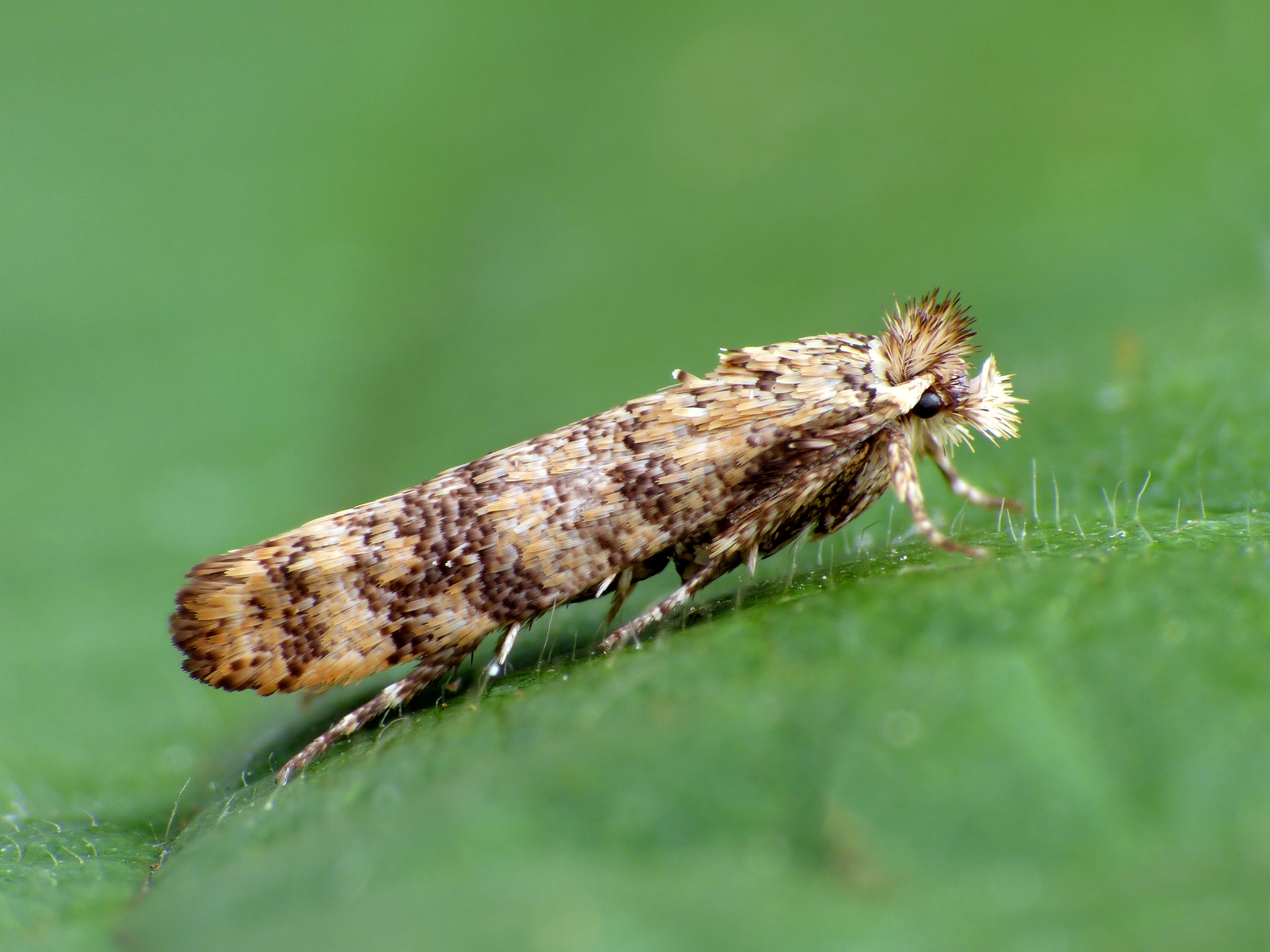
- Male, side view

Scientific classification
- Kingdom: Animalia
- Phylum: Arthropoda
- Class: Insecta
- Order: Lepidoptera
- Family: Ypsolophidae
- Genus: Ochsenheimeria
- Species: O. taurella

Binomial name
- Ochsenheimeria taurella (Denis & Schiffermuller, 1775)

Synonyms
- List: Tinea taurella Denis & Schiffermuller, 1775; Ypsolophus mediopectinellus Haworth, 1828; Ochsenheimeria mediopectinellus (Haworth, 1828); Lepidocera birdella Curtis, 1831; Ochsenheimeria birdella; Ochsenheimeria hederarum Milliere, 1874; Ochsenheimeria baurella Zagulajev, 1966; Ochsenheimeria trifasciata Wocke, 1871; Ochsenheimeria talhouki Amsel, 1947

= Ochsenheimeria taurella =

Species of moth

Ochsenheimeria taurella, the Liverpool feather-horn or the rye stem borer, is a moth of the family Ypsolophidae.

== Distribution ==
This species can be found in most of Europe, as well as North Africa and the Middle East.

== Description ==
Ochsenheimeria taurella has a wingspan of 11–12 mm. These rather distinctive microlepidoptera have brownish or ochreous forewings, with erect scales. These scales sometimes tend to form ill-defined fasciae of different colour. A tuft of erect scales in present on the head. The abdomen is dark brown. The females have the antennae with long black erected scales for over half of their length. Metrick - Antennae thickened with rough scales to above middle. Forewings fuscous or ochreous fuscous, mixed with lighter and darker, and with loosely raised scales. Hindwings rather dark purplish-fuscous, becoming transparent on a patch towards base. Larva slender, whitish-yellowish; head pale yellow-brownish. This species is rather similar to Ochsenheimeria vacculella, but the latter lacks the erect antennal scales.

== Biology ==
Adults are on wing from July to September. They fly in the early afternoon sunshine. From September to May, the caterpillars overwinter. They feed on various coarse grasses (Poaceae), including cock's-foot (Dactylis glomerata), rough bluegrass (Poa trivialis), rye (Secale cereale) (hence the common name), meadow foxtail (Alopecurus pratensis), barley (Hordeum vulgare), oat (Avena sativa) and wheat (Triticum aestivum). They mine the stems of their host plant.

== Bibliography ==
- Aarvik, L., Bengtsson, B.Å., Elven, H., Ivinskis, P., Jurivete, U., Karsholt, O., Mutanen, M. & N. Savenkov (2017): Nordic-Baltic Checklist of Lepidoptera. — Norwegian Journal of Entomology - Supplement No. 3: 1-236.
- Curtis, J. (1823-1840): British Entomology; Being Illustrations and Descriptions of the Genera of Insects Found in Great Britain and Ireland: Containing Coloured Figures from Nature of the Most Rare and Beautiful Species, and in Many Instances of the Plants upon which they are Found. Vol. VI. Lepidoptera, Part II. London (E. Ellis & Co.).
- Denis, M. & J. I. Schiffermuller (1775): Ankündung eines systematischen Werkes von den Schmetterlingen der Wienergegend herausgegeben von einigen Lehrern am k. k. Theresianum. 1-323, Wien (Augustin Bernardi)
- Stainton, H. T. (1873): The natural history of the Tineina 13: I-VIII, London (John van Voorst)
