= Cerasus =

Cerasus may refer to:

== Plants and fruits ==
- Cerasus,
  - a dated synonym of the genus Prunus
  - a subgenus of the genus Prunus, see Prunus subg. Cerasus
- Prunus cerasus (sour cherry), a species of Prunus in the subgenus Cerasus
- Cherry, some of which are members of Prunus subg. Cerasus

== Places ==
Κερασοῦς, towns on the Black Sea coast of Asia Minor:

- Cerasus (near Trapezus), near Vakfıkebir
- Giresun, ancient provincial capital of Giresun Province in the Black Sea Region of northeastern Turkey
