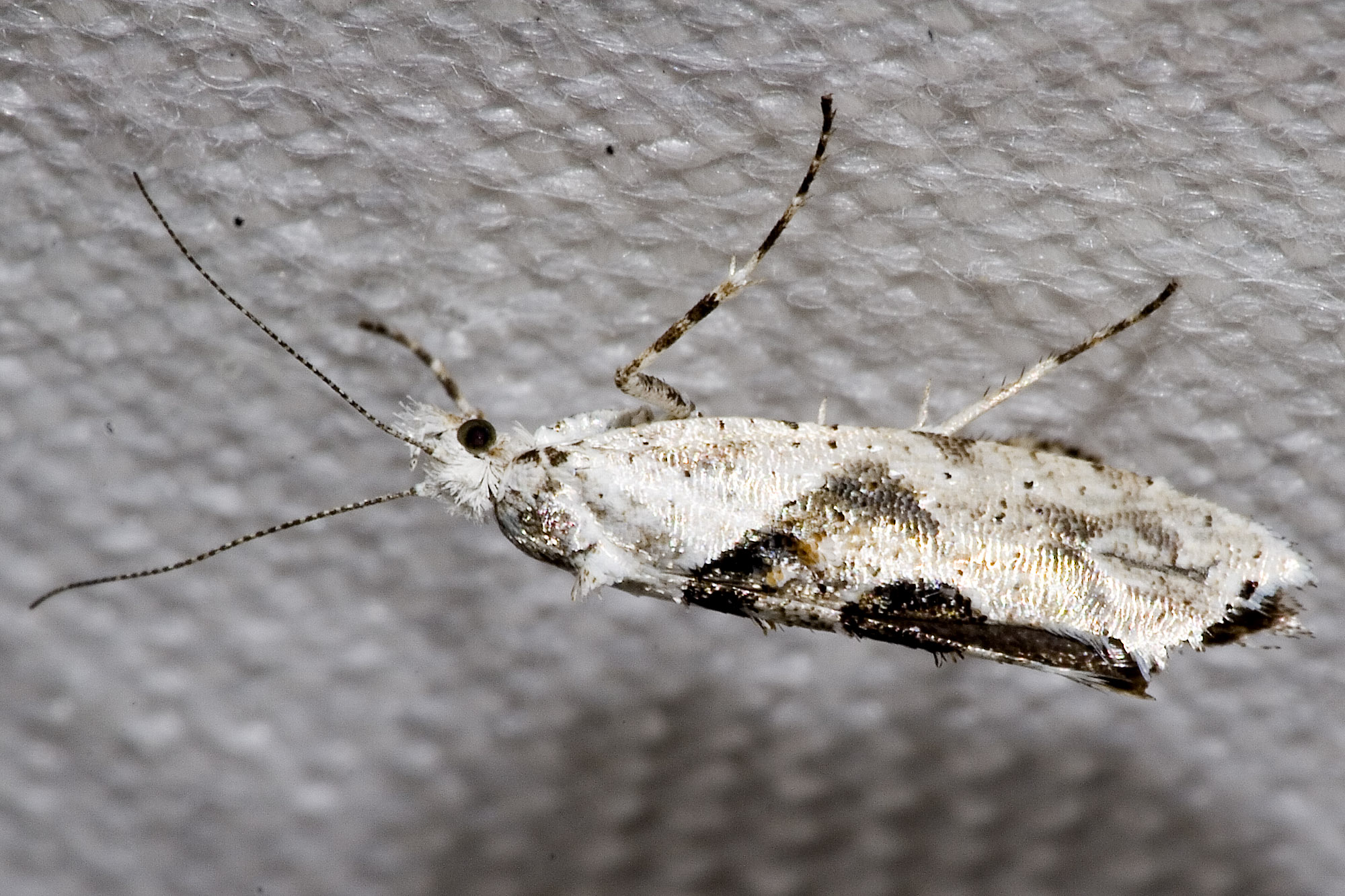
- Ypsolopha asperella from Germany
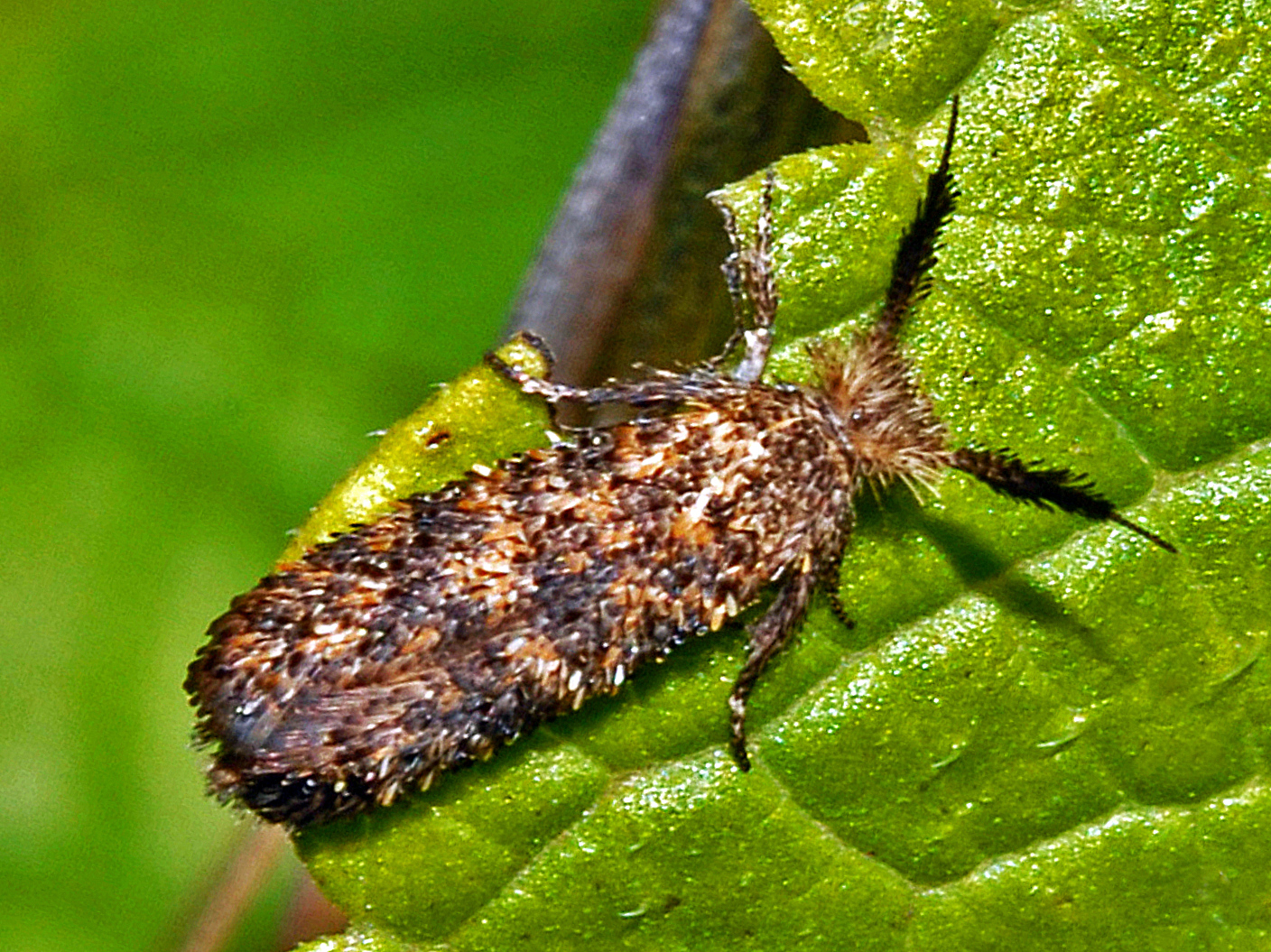
- Ochsenheimeria taurella from Cerreto, Italy

Scientific classification
- Kingdom: Animalia
- Phylum: Arthropoda
- Clade: Pancrustacea
- Class: Insecta
- Order: Lepidoptera
- Superfamily: Yponomeutoidea
- Family: Ypsolophidae; Guenée, 1845

Subfamilies
- Ochsenheimeriinae; Ypsolophinae; Unassigned genera: see text

= Ypsolophidae =

Family of moths

Ypsolophidae is a family of moths that belongs within the superfamily Yponomeutoidea.

The family was erected in 1845 by Achille Guenée, a French entomologist and lawyer. They are included within the family Plutellidae by many authors.

== Taxonomy ==
The family contains more than 90 genera and around 360 species that are divided into two subfamilies, Ypsolophinae and Ochsenheimeriinae, and various genera that are currently unassigned to a subfamily. A list of genera and their assignment can be found below:

=== Ypsolophinae ===
- Phrealcia Chrétien, 1900
- Ypsolopha Latreille, 1796

=== Ochsenheimeriinae ===
- Ochsenheimeria Hübner, 1825

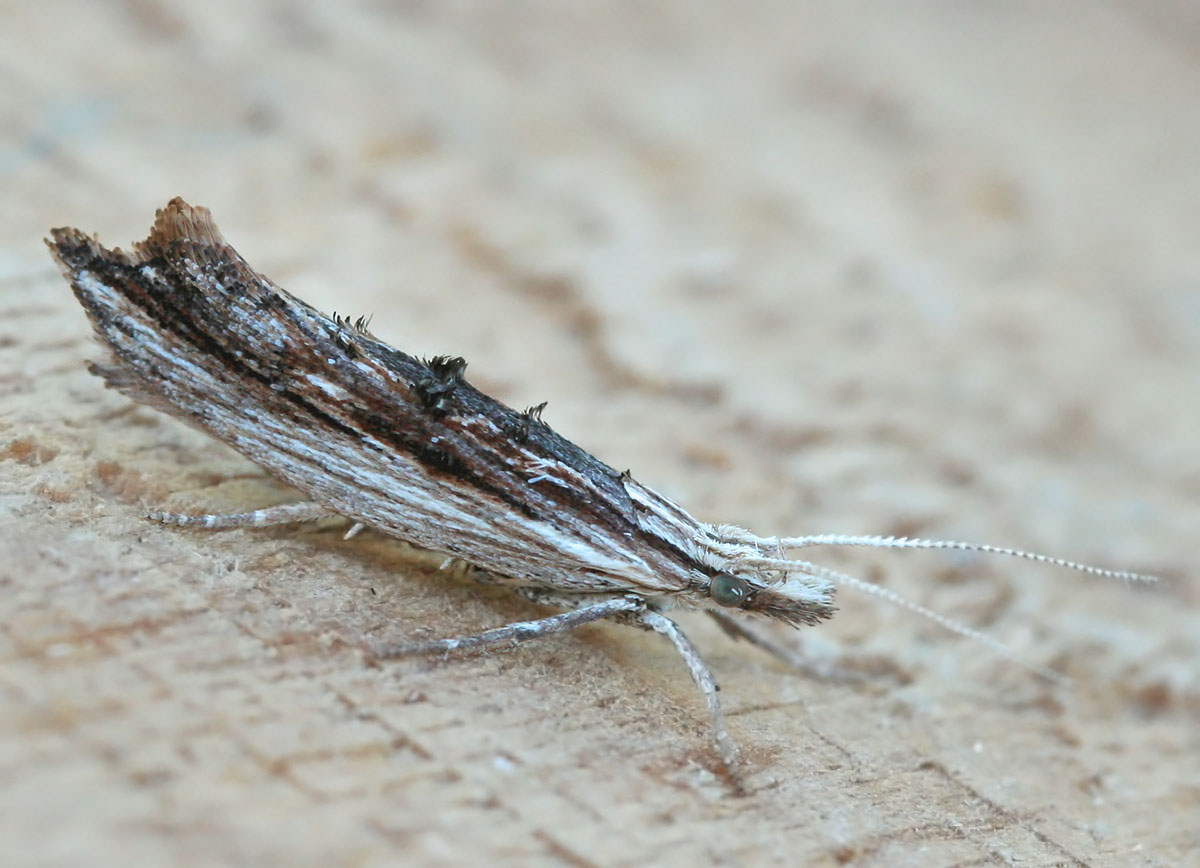
Ypsolopha scabrella

The following genera are not assigned to a subfamily:

- Alapa
- Bhadorcosma
  - Bhadorcosma lonicerae Moriuti, 1977
- Euceratia
  - Euceratia castella Walsingham, 1881
  - Euceratia securella Walsingham, 1881
- Rhabdocosma
  - Rhabdocosma aglaophanes Meyrick, 1935
  - Rhabdocosma dolini Gershenson, 2001
