= Pinion (moth) =

Pinion may refer to a number of moths mostly in the family Noctuidae:

- Brown-spot pinion, Agrochola litura
- Lesser spotted pinion, Cosmia affinis
- Lunar-spotted pinion, Cosmia pyralina
- Pale pinion, Lithophane socia
- Pretty pinion, Perizoma blandiata (family Geometridae)
- Tawny pinion, Lithophane semibrunnea
- White-spotted pinion, Cosmia diffinis

== See also ==
- Pinion (disambiguation)
