= Cosmia elisae =

Scientific classification
- Kingdom: Animalia
- Phylum: Arthropoda
- Clade: Pancrustacea
- Class: Insecta
- Order: Lepidoptera
- Superfamily: Noctuoidea
- Family: Noctuidae
- Tribe: Xylenini
- Subtribe: Cosmiina
- Genus: Cosmia
- Species: C. elisae

Binomial name
- Cosmia elisae Lafontaine & Troubridge, 2003

Species of moth

Cosmia elisae is a species of cutworm or dart moth in the family Noctuidae. It is found in North America.
