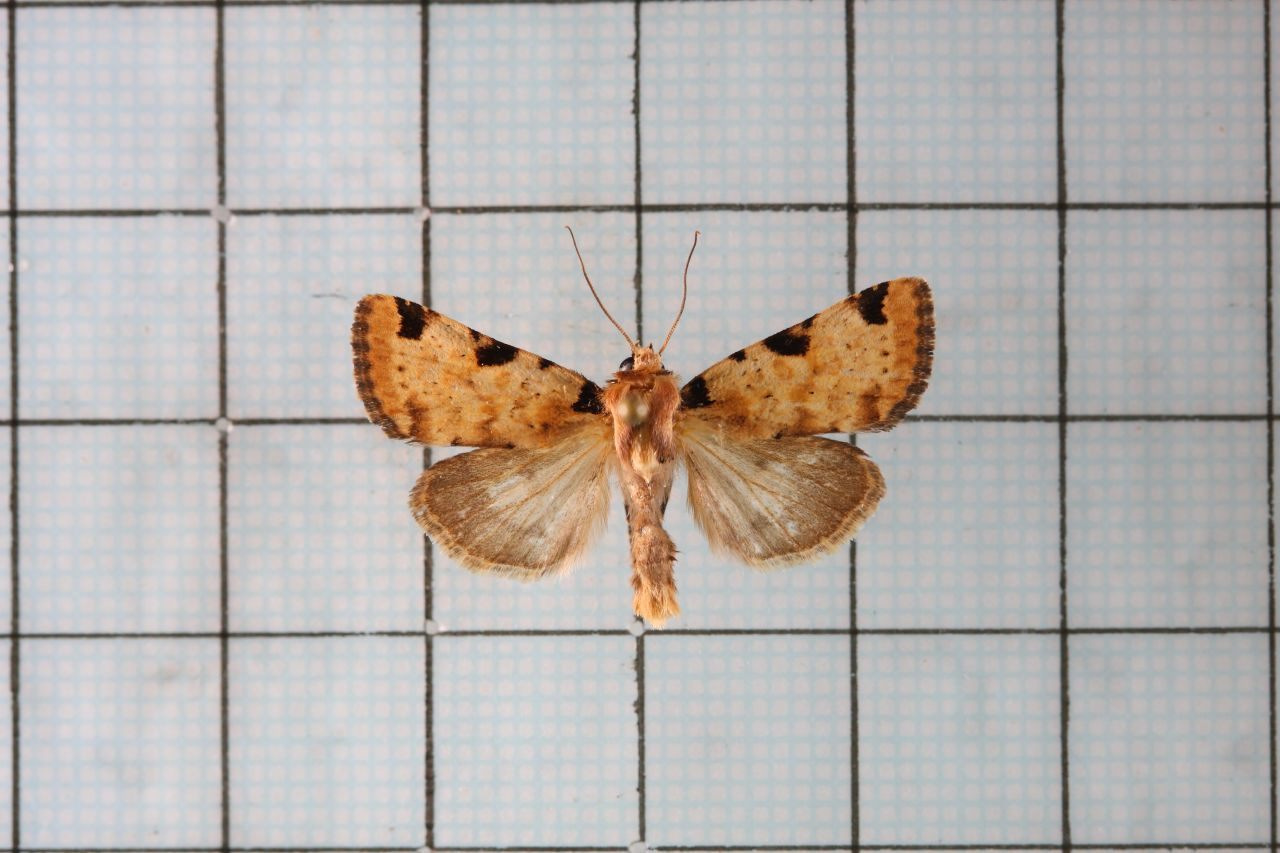

Scientific classification
- Domain: Eukaryota
- Kingdom: Animalia
- Phylum: Arthropoda
- Class: Insecta
- Order: Lepidoptera
- Superfamily: Noctuoidea
- Family: Noctuidae
- Genus: Cosmia
- Species: C. poecila

Binomial name
- Cosmia poecila Hreblay & Ronkay, 1997

= Cosmia poecila =

Species of moth

Cosmia poecila is a moth of the family Noctuidae. It is found in Taiwan.
