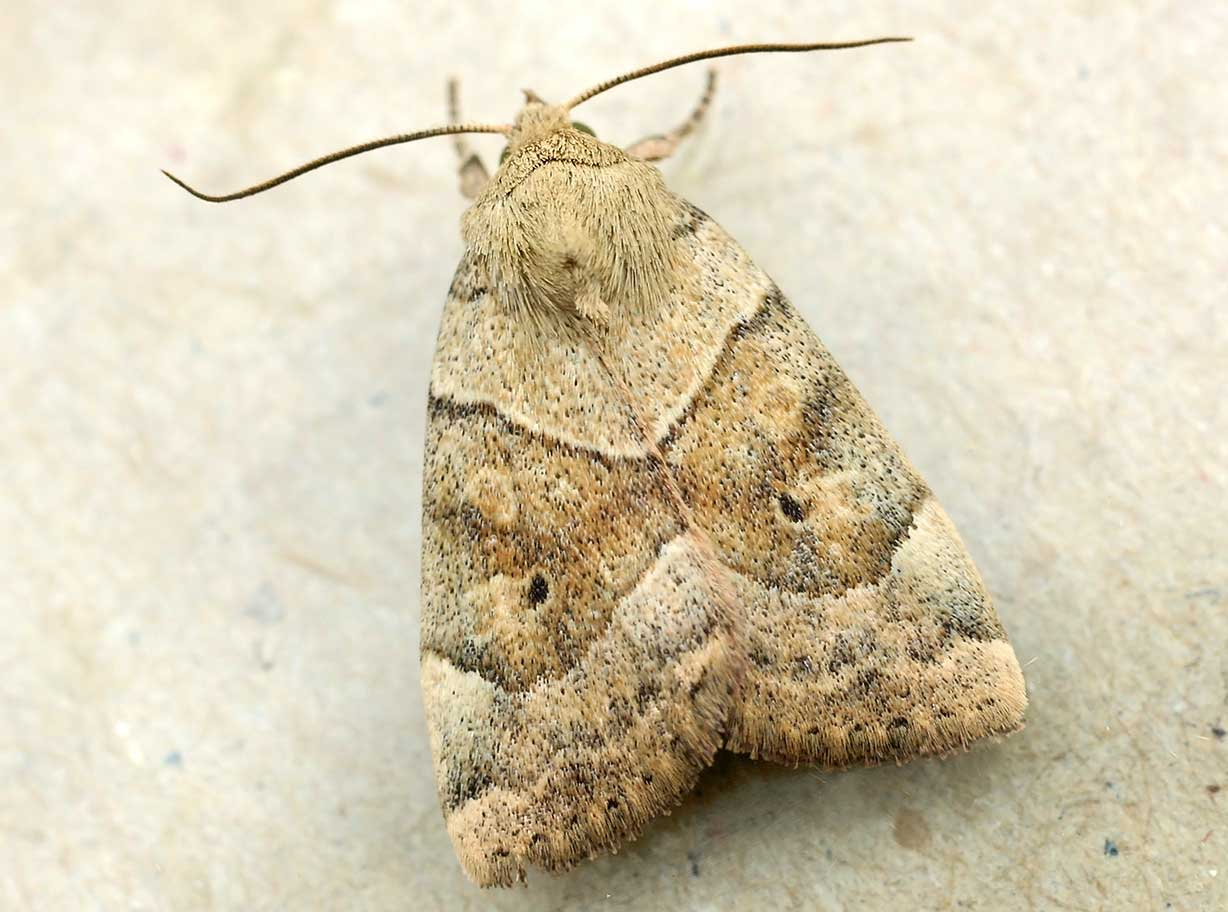

Scientific classification
- Kingdom: Animalia
- Phylum: Arthropoda
- Clade: Pancrustacea
- Class: Insecta
- Order: Lepidoptera
- Superfamily: Noctuoidea
- Family: Noctuidae
- Genus: Cosmia
- Species: C. trapezina

Binomial name
- Cosmia trapezina (Linnaeus, 1758)

= Dun-bar =

Species of moth

The dun-bar (Cosmia trapezina) is a moth of the family Noctuidae. It is a common Palearctic species.

== Distribution ==
The species occurs throughout almost the whole of Europe. In the north, the range extends to Middle Fennoscandia, in the east to the Urals. The species occurs in North Africa, Asia minor, Syria, Iraq, Iran, Caucasus, Central Asia to China, Korea and Japan (subspecies C. t. exigua (Butler, 1881)). It rises in the Alps up to 1600 m.

== Description ==
This is a very variable species, both in size (wingspan 28–38 mm) and colour. The ground colour of the forewings varies from pale buff to dark or reddish brown with three narrow fascia. The area between the inner two fascia is sometimes much darker than the surrounding ground colour and is marked with stigmata, often quite indistinct. Melanic forms occasionally occur. The hindwings vary from pale cream to dingy brown. This moth flies at night from July to September and is attracted to light and sugar and sometimes to nectar-rich flowers.

The larva is green with yellow lines and black and white spots. It feeds on a variety of plants, chiefly trees and shrubs (see list below) and also on the larvae of other Lepidoptera species, even occasionally its own species. The species overwinters as an egg.

1. The flight season refers to the British Isles. This may vary in other parts of the range.

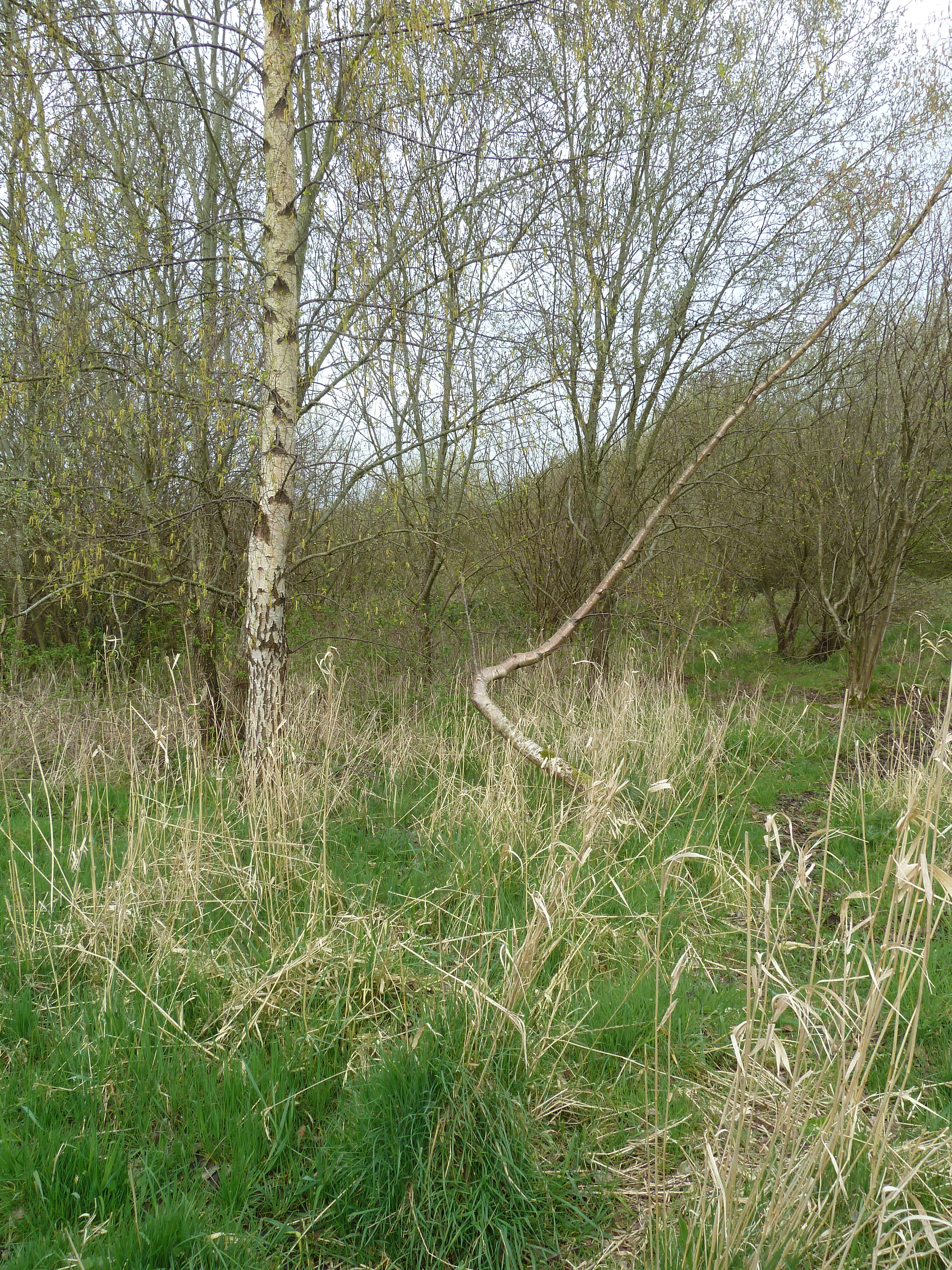
Habitat in Ireland.

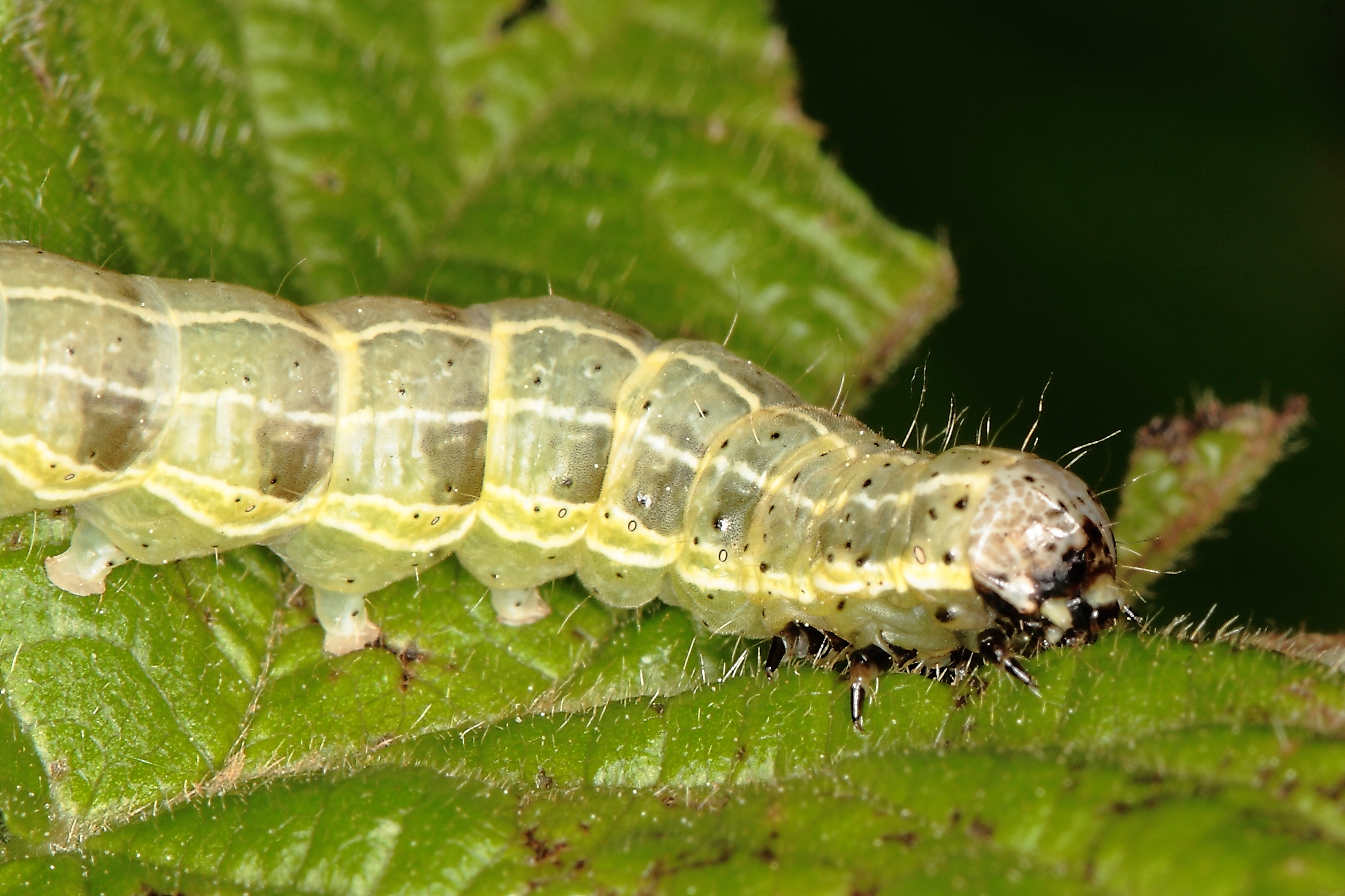
Larva

== Recorded food plants ==
- Acer – maple
- Betula – birch
- Corylus – hazel
- Crataegus – hawthorn
- Hippophae – sea-buckthorn
- Lilium – lily
- Malus – apple
- Prunus
- Pyrus – pear
- Quercus – oak
- Rhamnus – buckthorn
- Rhododendron
- Ribes – currant
- Rubus – bramble
- Salix – willow
- Sorbus – rowan
- Tilia – lime
- Ulmus – wych elm

See.
