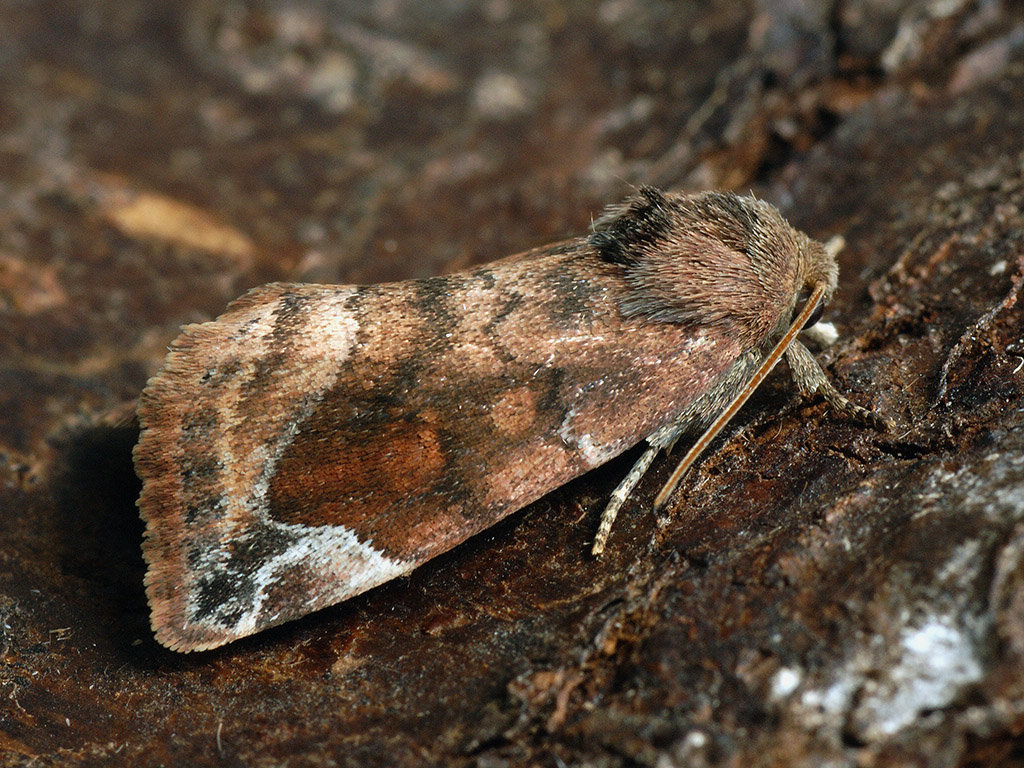
- Dorsal view
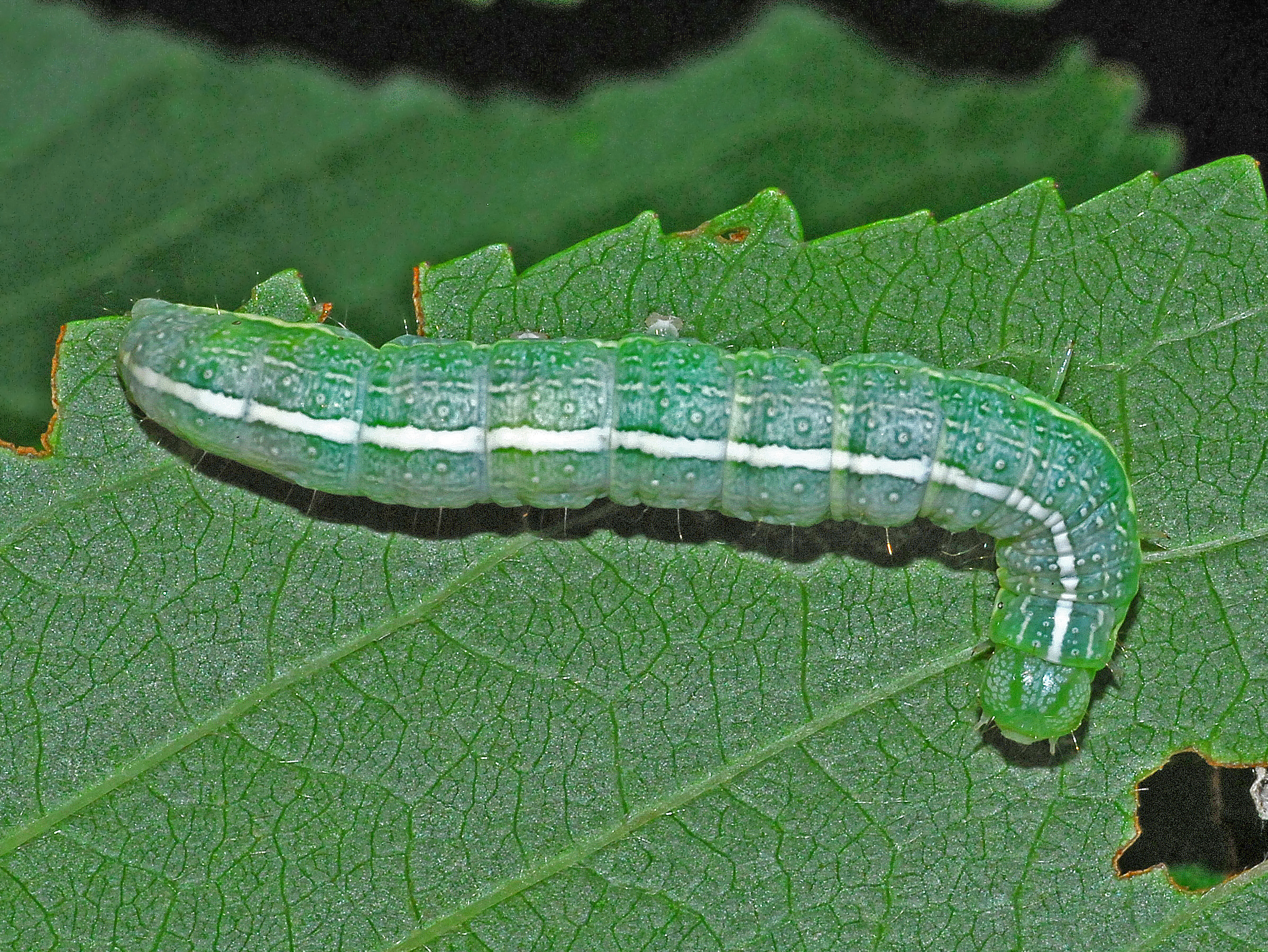
- Larva

Scientific classification
- Domain: Eukaryota
- Kingdom: Animalia
- Phylum: Arthropoda
- Class: Insecta
- Order: Lepidoptera
- Superfamily: Noctuoidea
- Family: Noctuidae
- Genus: Cosmia
- Species: C. pyralina

Binomial name
- Cosmia pyralina (Denis & Schiffermüller, 1775)

Synonyms
- Noctua pyralina Denis & Schiffermüller, 1775; Phalaena (Noctua) corrusca Esper, 1798

= Cosmia pyralina =

Species of moth

Cosmia pyralina, the lunar-spotted pinion, is a moth of the family Noctuidae.

== Distribution ==
This species can be found central Europe, in the north up to central Great Britain and southern Fennoscandia, south to northern Spain and central Italy, east through Bulgaria up to the Caucasus further through the Palearctic up to Korea and Japan.

== Technical description and variation ==
C. pyralina View. (47 e). Forewing dull or bright redbrown on a pinker ground; generally darkened with olive fuscous; first line blackish, oblique, not white-edged, angled outwards between and inwards on the veins; outer line preceded by a darker median shade, and edged with white, the white becoming diffused on costa and joined to the white streak before the submarginal line; stigmata very obscure, sometimes with dark centres on a paler ground; submarginal line preceded by a darker red shade; wing pale grey in the male, darker in the female; the brighter coloured forms are ab. corusea Esp. (47 e). Larva pale green with white lines; spiracular line yellowish, black edged above; head yellow green. Cosmia pyralina has a wingspan reaching 28–32 mm.

This moth is rather similar Cosmia affinis, but it shows paler hindwings and broader forewings.

== Biology ==
Adults are on wing from June to August in one generation. The larvae feed on various deciduous trees, including Ulmus, Pyrus, Salix and Quercus living between united leaves, spinning a slight silken web in which to pupate.
