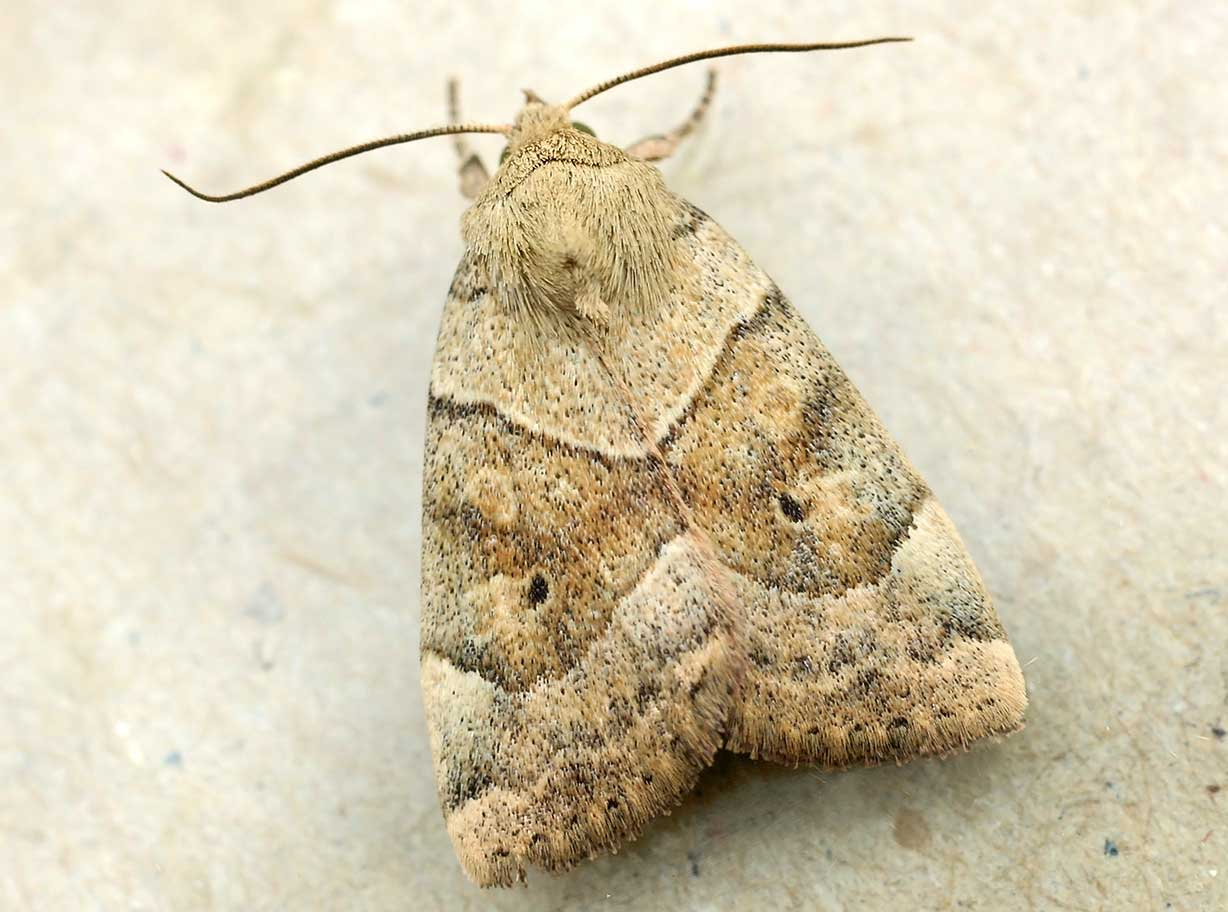
- Cosmia trapezina

Scientific classification
- Domain: Eukaryota
- Kingdom: Animalia
- Phylum: Arthropoda
- Class: Insecta
- Order: Lepidoptera
- Superfamily: Noctuoidea
- Family: Noctuidae
- Tribe: Xylenini
- Subtribe: Cosmiina
- Genus: Cosmia; Ochsenheimer, 1816

Synonyms
- Calymnia Hübner, [1821]; Eustegnia Hübner, [1821]

= Cosmia =

Genus of moths

Cosmia is a genus of moths of the family Noctuidae.

== Species ==
- Cosmia achatina Butler, 1879
- Cosmia affinis – lesser-spotted pinion (Linnaeus, 1767)
- Cosmia angulifera Boursin, 1957
- Cosmia calami (Harvey, 1876)
- Cosmia camptostigma (Ménétriés, 1859)
- Cosmia cara (Butler, 1881)
- Cosmia confinis Herrich-Schäffer, [1849]
- Cosmia diffinis (Linnaeus, 1767)
- Cosmia elisae Lafontaine & Troubridge, 2003
- Cosmia epipaschia (Grote, 1883)
- Cosmia flavifimbria (Hampson, 1910)
- Cosmia foveata (Pagenstecher, 1888)
- Cosmia hangrongtzuooi Ronkay & Ronkay, 1999
- Cosmia inconspicua (Draudt, 1950)
- Cosmia ledereri (Staudinger, 1897)
- Cosmia limacodina Sugi, 1997
- Cosmia mali Sugi, 1982
- Cosmia moderata (Staudinger, 1888)
- Cosmia monotona (Hampson, 1914)
- Cosmia natalensis (Prout, 1925)
- Cosmia ochreimargo (Hampson, 1894)
- Cosmia olivescens (Hampson, 1910)
- Cosmia poecila Hreblay & Ronkay, 1997
- Cosmia polymorpha Pinhey, 1968
- Cosmia praeacuta (Smith, 1894) (syn: Cosmia parvimacula Smith, 1903)
- Cosmia pyralina – lunar-spotted pinion (Denis & Schiffermüller, 1775)
- Cosmia restituta Walker, [1857]
- Cosmia sanguinea Sugi, 1955
- Cosmia spurcopyga (Alphéraky, 1895)
- Cosmia subtilis Staudinger, 1888
- Cosmia trapezina – dun-bar (Linnaeus, 1758)
- Cosmia trilineata (Motschulsky, 1860)
- Cosmia unicolor (Staudinger, 1892)
