= Pinion (disambiguation) =

Pinion is a round gear, usually the smaller of two meshed gears.

Pinion may also refer to:

== Birds ==
- Pinion (feather), an outermost primary flight feather on a bird's wing
- Pinioning, the act of surgically removing a bird's pinion joint

== People ==
- Bradley Pinion (born 1994), American football punter
- Joe Pinion (born 1983), American politician
- Offutt Pinion (1924–1961), American sport shooter

== Places ==
- Pinion, Arizona
- Pinion Rock

== Taxonomy ==
- Pinyon (or pinion, piñon), a group of pines
- Pinion (moth), a number of moths mostly in the family Noctuidae

== Other uses ==
- "Pinion", an instrumental song by Nine Inch Nails from the 1992 EP Broken
