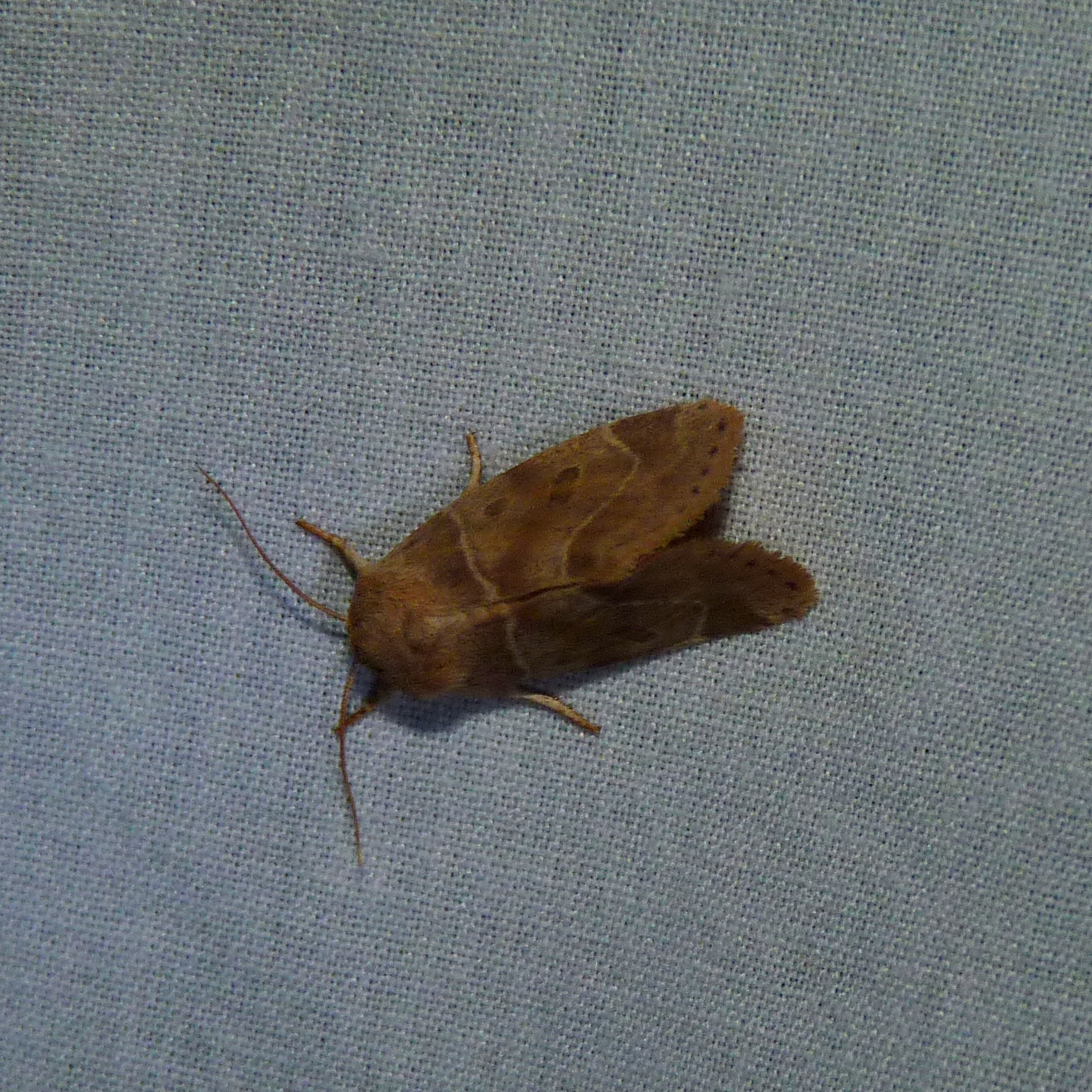

Scientific classification
- Kingdom: Animalia
- Phylum: Arthropoda
- Class: Insecta
- Order: Lepidoptera
- Superfamily: Noctuoidea
- Family: Noctuidae
- Genus: Cosmia
- Species: C. calami

Binomial name
- Cosmia calami (Harvey, 1876)

Synonyms
- Calymnia calami Harvey, 1876; Cosmia calamia McDunnough, 1938; Atethmia canescens Behr, 1885; Cosmia calami f. orinellla (Strand, 1916); Cosmia calami f. orinula (Strand, 1916)

= Cosmia calami =

American dun-bar moth

Species of moth

Cosmia calami, the American dun-bar moth, is a moth in the family Noctuidae. It is found in North America, including California, Georgia, Massachusetts, Minnesota, New Hampshire, New Jersey, Oregon, Pennsylvania, Tennessee, Washington and Wisconsin.

The wingspan is about 32 mm (1.3 in).

The larvae are carnivorous and feed on geometrid caterpillars that feed on Quercus species.
