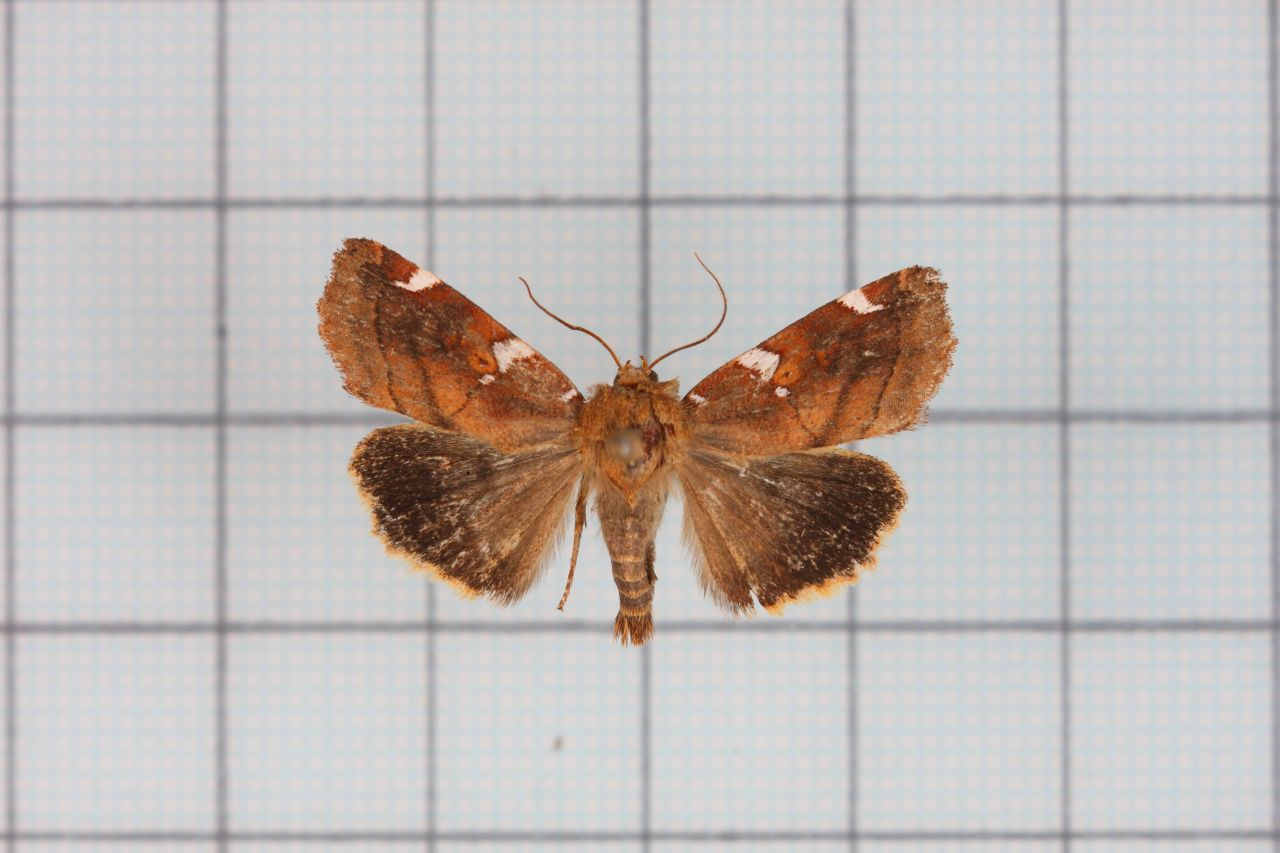

Scientific classification
- Kingdom: Animalia
- Phylum: Arthropoda
- Class: Insecta
- Order: Lepidoptera
- Superfamily: Noctuoidea
- Family: Noctuidae
- Genus: Cosmia
- Species: C. restituta

Binomial name
- Cosmia restituta Walker, [1857]

Synonyms
- Calymnia picta Staudinger, 1888; Calymnia dieckmanni Graeser, 1889

= Cosmia restituta =

Species of moth

Cosmia restituta is a moth of the family Noctuidae. It is found in the Russian Far East, Korea, Japan, Nepal and Taiwan.

The length of the forewings is about 14 mm and the wingspan is 25–29 mm.

== Subspecies ==
- Cosmia restituta restituta
- Cosmia restituta picta (Staudinger, 1888) (Siberia, Japan)
