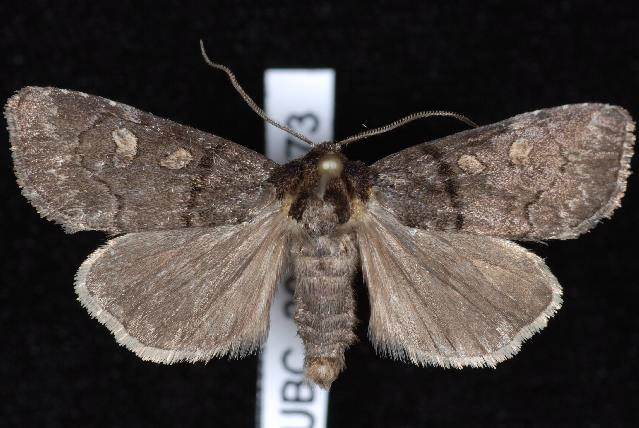

Scientific classification
- Domain: Eukaryota
- Kingdom: Animalia
- Phylum: Arthropoda
- Class: Insecta
- Order: Lepidoptera
- Superfamily: Noctuoidea
- Family: Noctuidae
- Tribe: Xylenini
- Subtribe: Cosmiina
- Genus: Cosmia
- Species: C. praeacuta

Binomial name
- Cosmia praeacuta (Smith, 1894)

Synonyms
- Cosmia parvimacula Smith, 1903

= Cosmia praeacuta =

Species of moth

Cosmia praeacuta is a species of cutworm or dart moth in the family Noctuidae.

The MONA or Hodges number for Cosmia praeacuta is 9814.
