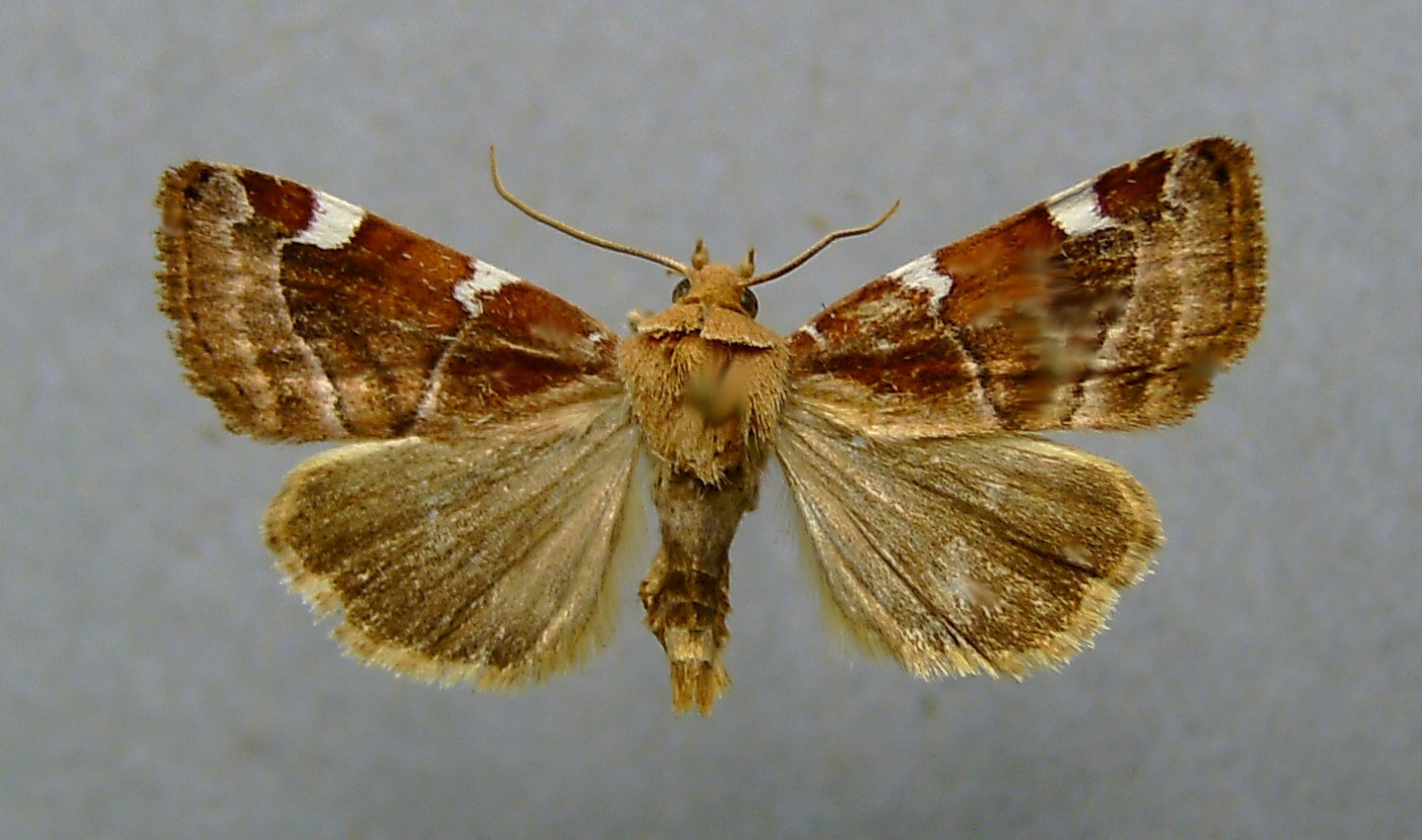

Scientific classification
- Kingdom: Animalia
- Phylum: Arthropoda
- Class: Insecta
- Order: Lepidoptera
- Superfamily: Noctuoidea
- Family: Noctuidae
- Genus: Cosmia
- Species: C. diffinis

Binomial name
- Cosmia diffinis (Linnaeus, 1767)

Synonyms
- Phalaena (Noctua) diffinis Linnaeus, 1767

= Cosmia diffinis =

Species of moth

Cosmia diffinis, the white-spotted pinion, is a moth of the family Noctuidae The species was first described by Carl Linnaeus in 1767. It is found in central and southern Europe, to the north it is found up to central England and the southern parts of the Netherlands. There is a disjunct population in Gotland. To the south, it is found down to Spain, Italy, Russia, northern Greece and Bulgaria. In the east, it is found as far as Lithuania and the Black Sea.

== Technical description and variation ==
C. diffinis L. (47 e). Forewing rich redbrown on a pinkish grey ground; distinguished from the other [Cosmia] species by the lines starting from broad white costal blotches, not narrow streaks; the hindwing paler, more olive brown, than in affinis; — ab. confinis H. Schaff. (47 e) has the pinkish ground colour predominant, the shading pale golden brown, the hindwing sometimes yellowish with dark outline and submarginal shade; on the contrary the ab. affinis Hbn. (47 e) has the deep purple tints intensified and darker, the insect being slightly smaller. Larva like that of affinis. The wingspan is 29–35 mm.

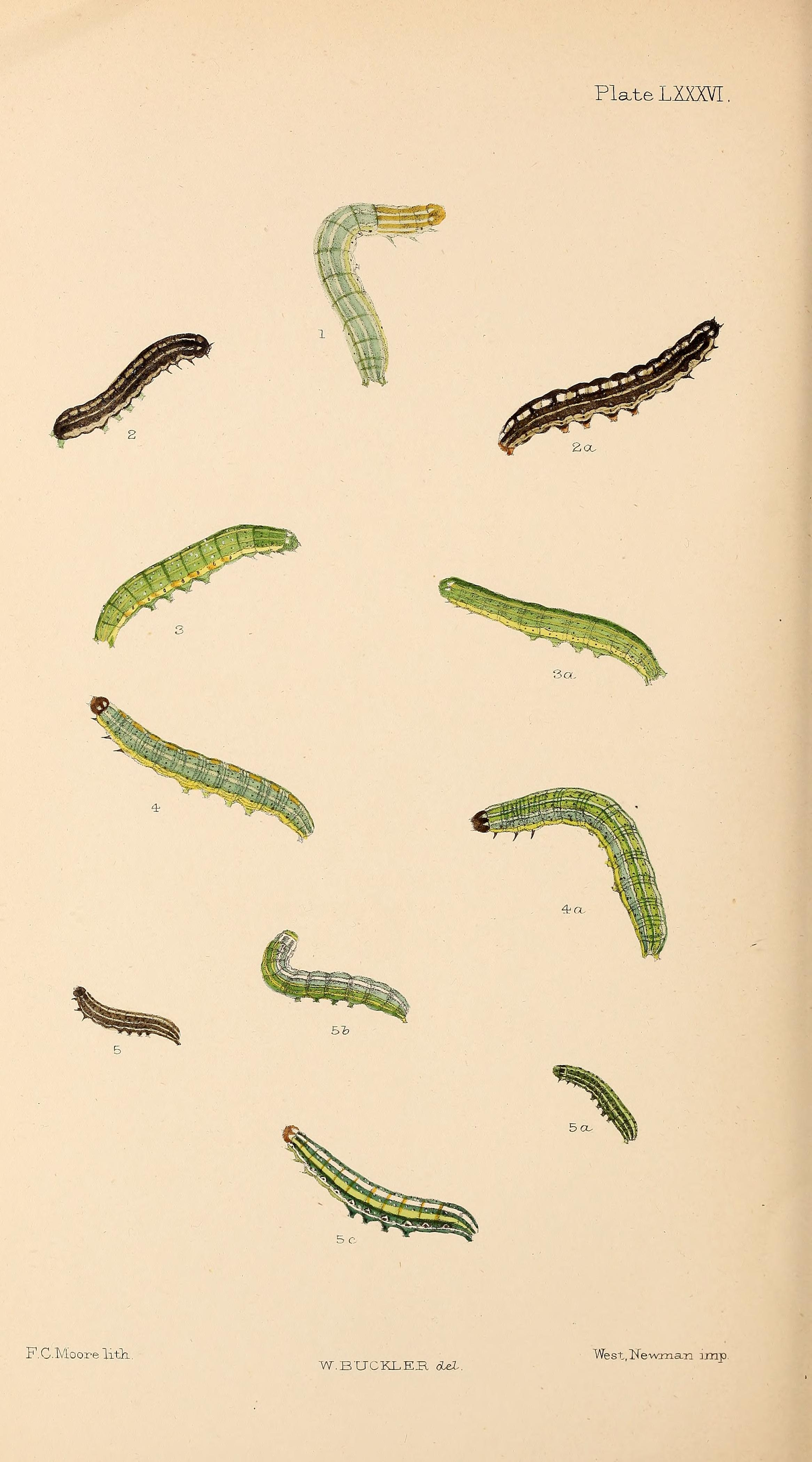
4, 4a larvae after final moult

== Biology ==
Adults are on wing from June to August in one generation.

The larvae feed on united leaves of elms.
