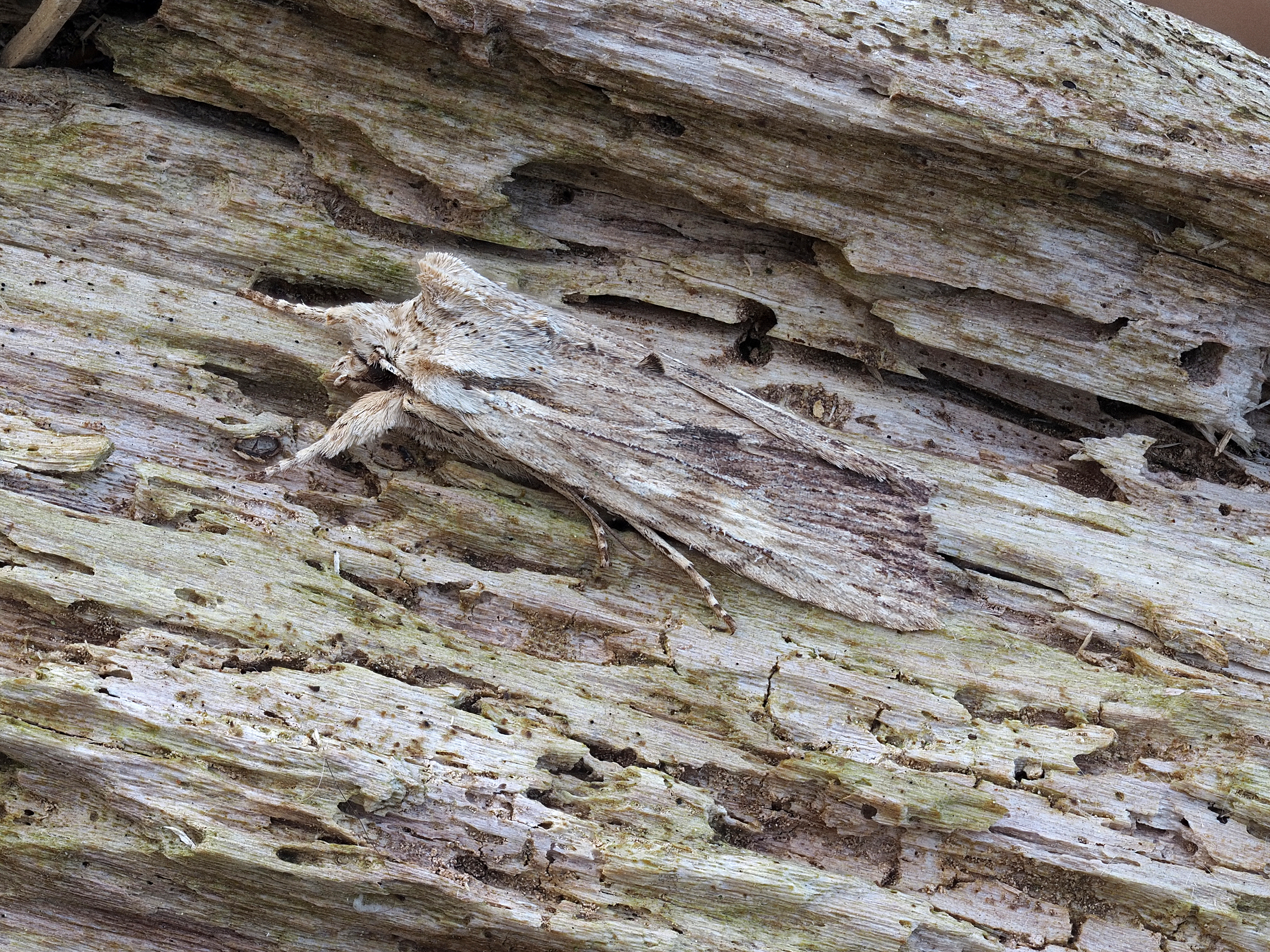

Scientific classification
- Domain: Eukaryota
- Kingdom: Animalia
- Phylum: Arthropoda
- Class: Insecta
- Order: Lepidoptera
- Superfamily: Noctuoidea
- Family: Noctuidae
- Genus: Lithophane
- Species: L. socia

Binomial name
- Lithophane socia (Hufnagel, 1766)

Synonyms
- Phalaena socia Hufnagel, 1766; Noctua petrificata Denis & Schiffermüller, 1775; Noctua petrificosa Hübner, [1803]; Lithophane petrolignea Hübner, [1821]; Xylophasia incognita Butler, 1885; Lithophane hepatica (Clerck, 1759)

= Lithophane socia =

Species of moth

Lithophane socia, the pale pinion, is a moth of the family Noctuidae. The species was first described by Johann Siegfried Hufnagel in 1766. It is found throughout western Europe from Spain to central Scandinavia then east across the Palearctic to Siberia, the Russian Far East and Japan.

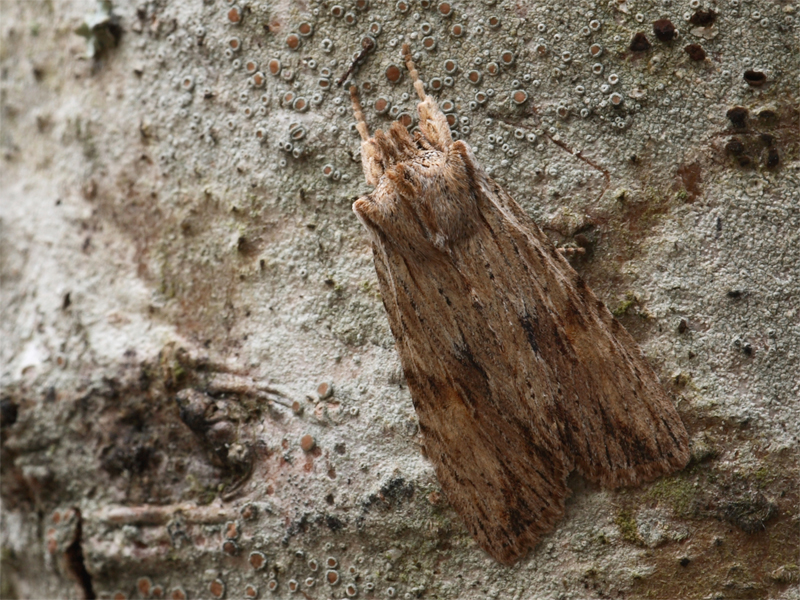

== Technical description and variation ==
The wingspan is 38–46 mm. Forewing broader than in L. semibrunnea Haw., with a blackish streak from base below cell; the inner marginal area not so completely darker; the stigmata plainer, pale ochreous, conversely oblique, the reniform reaching below median and edged below with a thick black line; a more or less plain dark median shade; black wedge-shaped marks before submarginal line; ab. umbrosa Esp. of which pallida Tutt seems to be only an extremely pale, less-marked, form, is more uniform ochreous brown, without dark suffusion; rufescens Tutt is a much rarer form, from the West of England and Ireland, in which the ochreous is suffused with rosy. Also see Noctuidae Europaeae

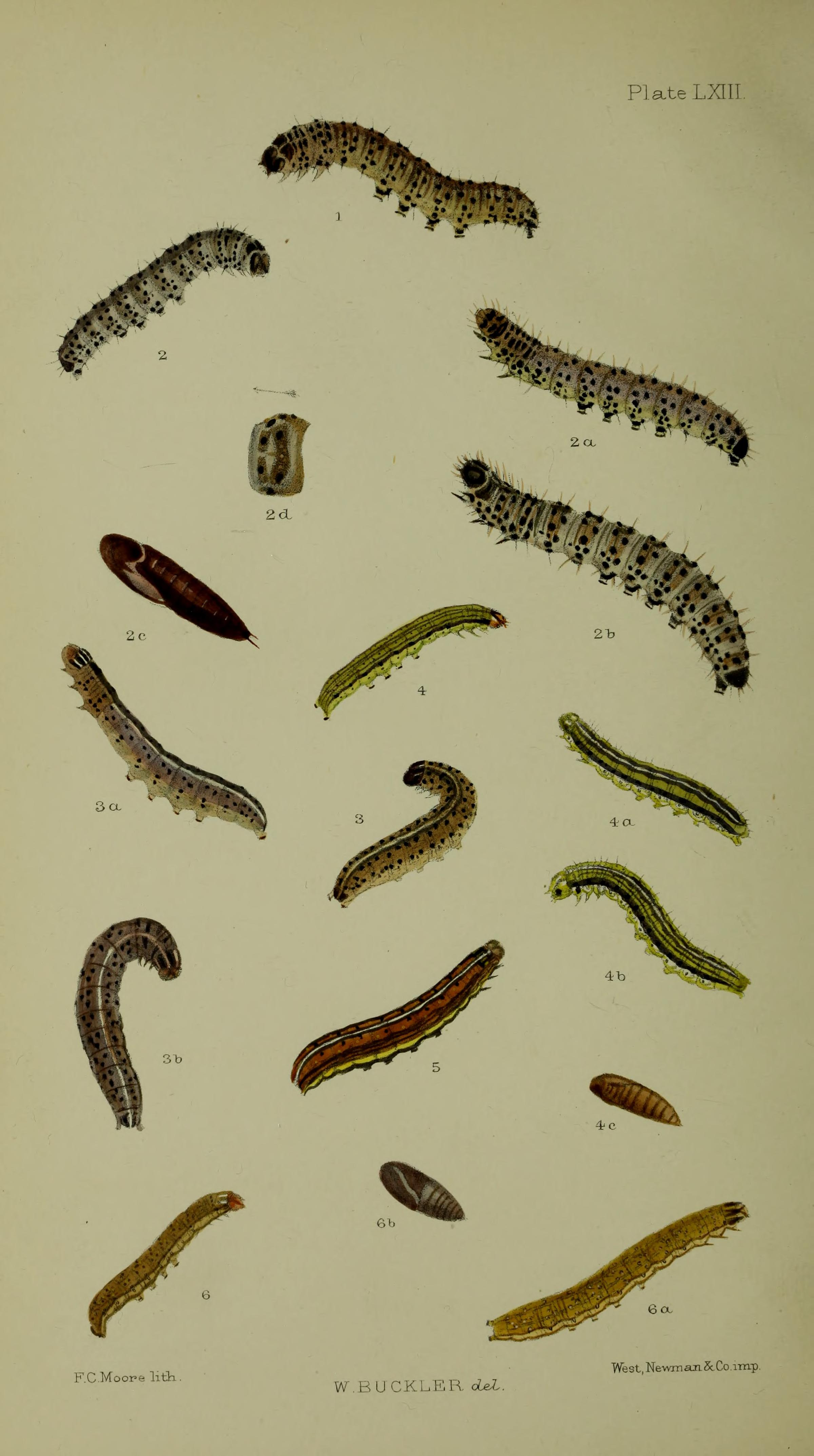
Figs.3, 3a, 3b

== Biology ==
Adults are on wing in October and November, and again after hibernation in early spring, when breeding occurs.

Larva apple green; dorsal line broadly white; subdorsal and spiracular lines more slenderly white; head green with dark mottling.

The young larvae feed on various trees and shrubs, including Salix species (including Salix caprea and Salix myrsinifolia), older larvae also feed on low growing plants such as Rumex species. Other recorded food plants include Betula (including Betula pubescens), Rubus idaeus, Malus domestica, Sorbus aucuparia, Prunus padus, Tilia species (including Tilia cordata), Vaccinium myrtillus, Syringa vulgaris and Viburnum opulus.

Adults are attracted to Hedera helix blossom and decaying fruit, including Rubus fruticosus. Lithophane socia is found in deciduous and mixed forests and on forest edge habitats.
