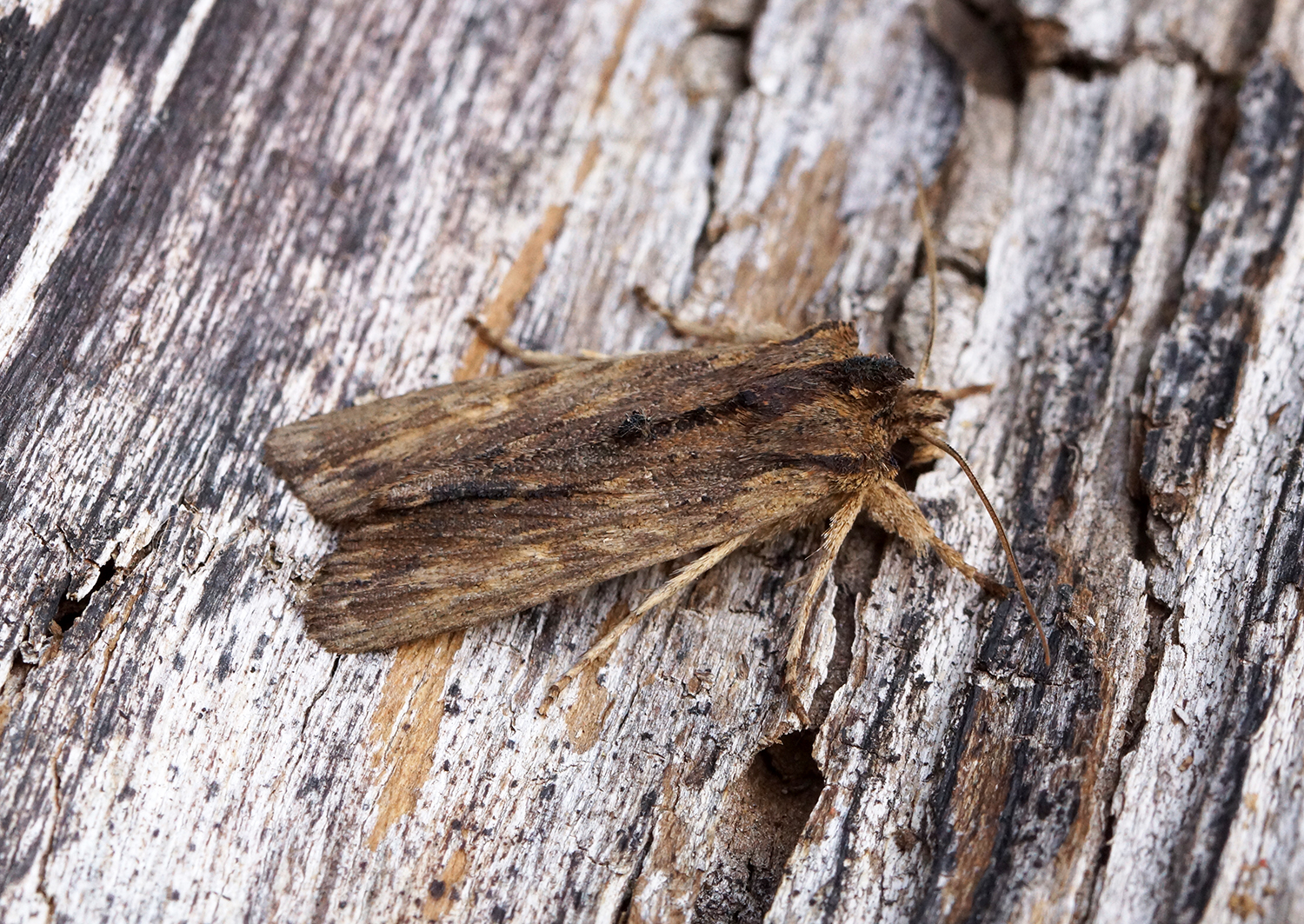

Scientific classification
- Domain: Eukaryota
- Kingdom: Animalia
- Phylum: Arthropoda
- Class: Insecta
- Order: Lepidoptera
- Superfamily: Noctuoidea
- Family: Noctuidae
- Genus: Lithophane
- Species: L. semibrunnea

Binomial name
- Lithophane semibrunnea (Haworth, 1809)

= Lithophane semibrunnea =

Tawny pinion

Species of moth

Lithophane semibrunnea, the tawny pinion, is a moth of the Noctuoidea family. It is found in scattered populations in North Africa, central and southern Europe and Asia Minor.

== Technical description and variation ==
The wingspan is 40–44 mm. Forewing dull wood brown, the inner-marginal half suffused with black brown, blackest on inner margin and in outer half of submedian interspace; veins marked with black scales; lines indistinct; the outer marked by pairs of black dots on veins and a white crescent on submedian fold; the submarginal line by a slighter one; hindwing greyish brown, paler in male, with the terminal area darker. Characteristic of newly emerged moths is a black-brown, often blue shimmering dorsal line, as well as black-brown lines on the shoulders. The dorsal crests on the abdomen are also black-blue; The anterior edge of the forewing is straight compared to other species of the genus, e.g. Lithophane socia.

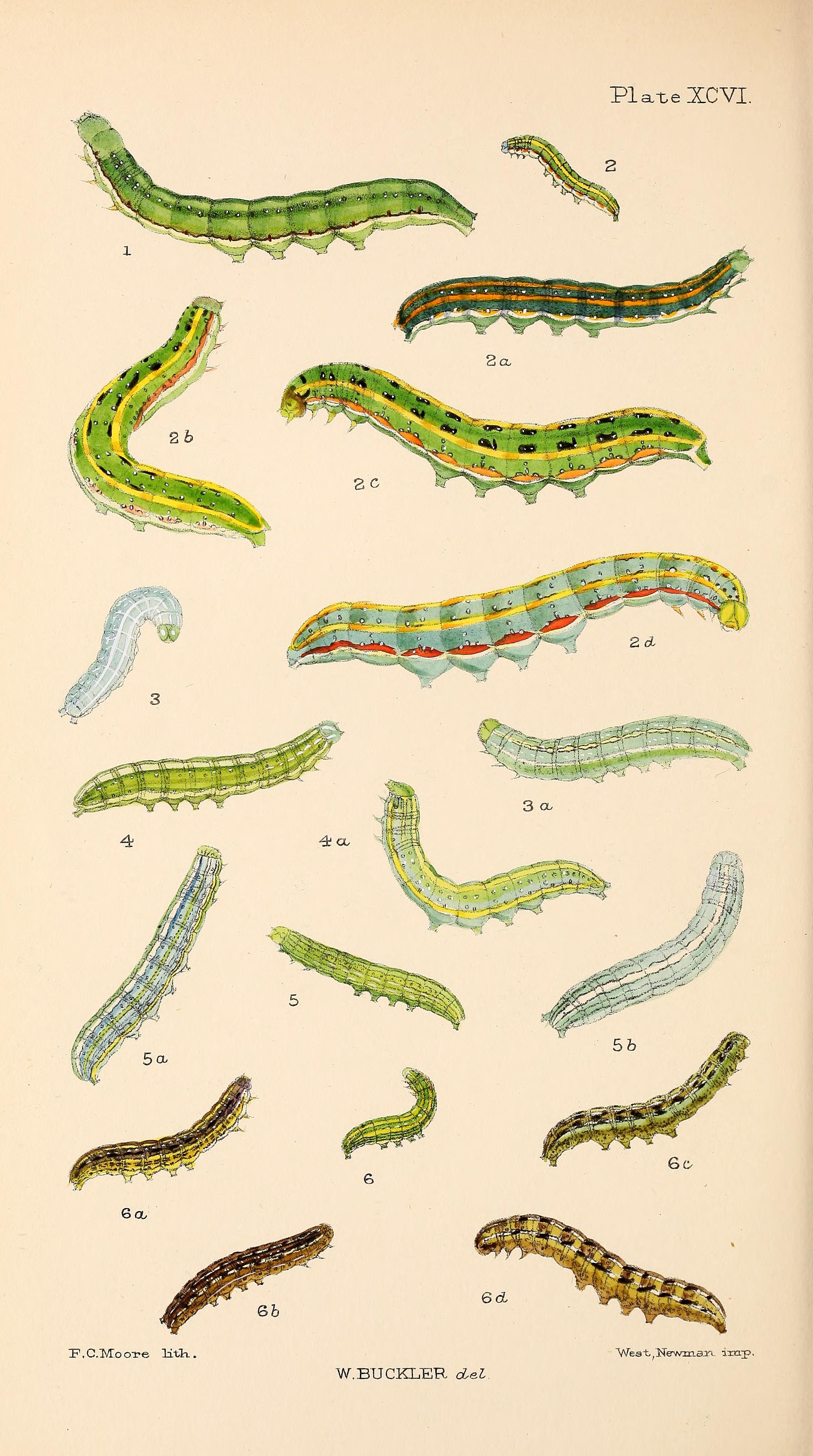
Figs.4, 4a larva after last moult

== Biology ==
The moth flies in late autumn.

Larva green; dorsal and subdorsal lines white; spiracular line broad, yellowish white, much varied with white dots and streaks below; head greenish; feeding on ash and other trees. The larvae mainly feed on Fraxinus excelsior.
