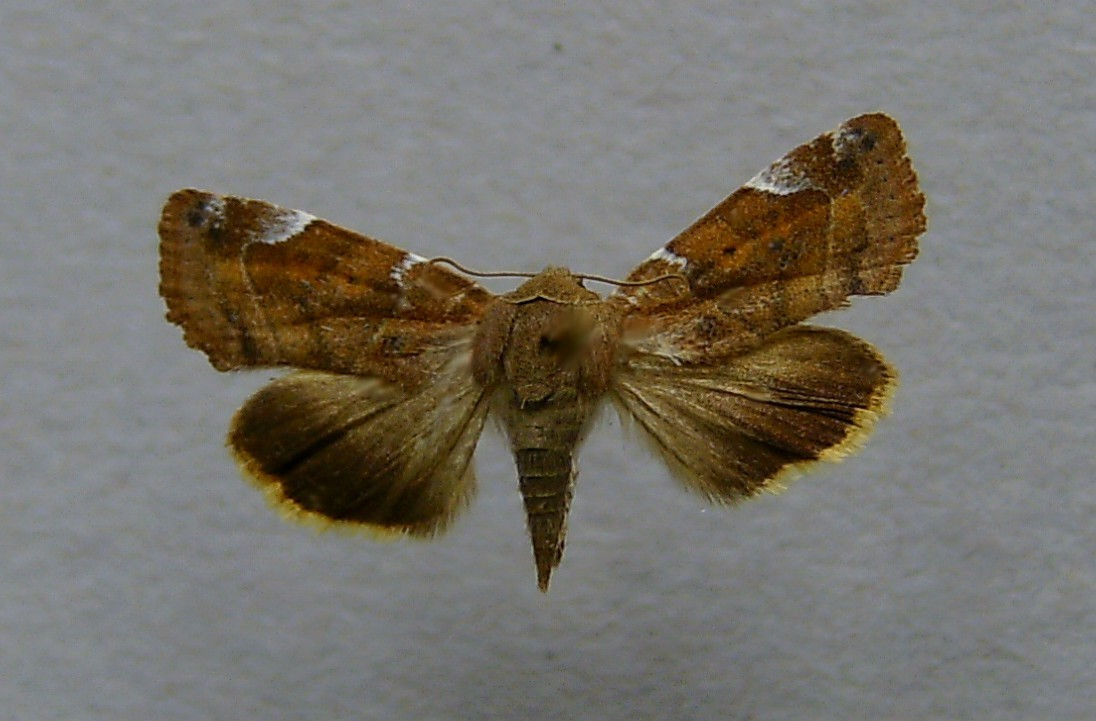

Scientific classification
- Kingdom: Animalia
- Phylum: Arthropoda
- Clade: Pancrustacea
- Class: Insecta
- Order: Lepidoptera
- Superfamily: Noctuoidea
- Family: Noctuidae
- Genus: Cosmia
- Species: C. affinis

Binomial name
- Cosmia affinis (Linnaeus, 1767)

Synonyms
- Phalaena (Noctua) affinis Linnaeus, 1767; Noctua palliata Fabricius, 1794

= Cosmia affinis =

Lesser-spotted pinion

Species of moth

Cosmia affinis, the lesser-spotted pinion, is a moth of the family Noctuidae. It is found in central and southern Europe, north to Great Britain, Denmark, southern Sweden up to Saint Petersburg. East, its range extends through northern and Central Asia up to Japan. It is also found in north-western Africa.

== Technical description and variation ==
C. affinis L. (47 d). Forewing fulvous or redbrown, more or less shaded with grey; inner and outer lines dark, conversely edged with paler, marked on costa generally by streaks of white scales; stigmata paler redbrown, undefined, the orbicular round, the reniform 8-shaped, with dark centres; submarginal line pale, waved, preceded by a deeper brown cloud, followed on costa by white scales, beyond which at the apex are two black spots; a row of small black marginal spots; hindwing blackish, black on terminal half; the fringe yellowish; instead of the red tints, examples occur of a greenish grey or pale brown colour = ab. suffusa Tutt (47 d), and ab. ochrea Tutt (47 d); a less common aberration occurring on the continent, but not confined to females as Spuler states; — ab. nigrimaculata ab. nov. (47 d) is marked by patches of black scales in the basal area along cell and vein 1, before and below the orbicular stigma, beyond the reniform in the angle of outer line, and more slightly before the termen. The Japanese examples are much larger than European = magna Stgr. (47 d); the white costal streaks are always less strongly developed, and are often altogether absent, the insect being more unicolor. or less uniformly red brown = ab. unicolor Stgr. (47 e). Larva pale green, with 5 white lines; the tubercles and the spiracles black. The wingspan is 28–33 mm.

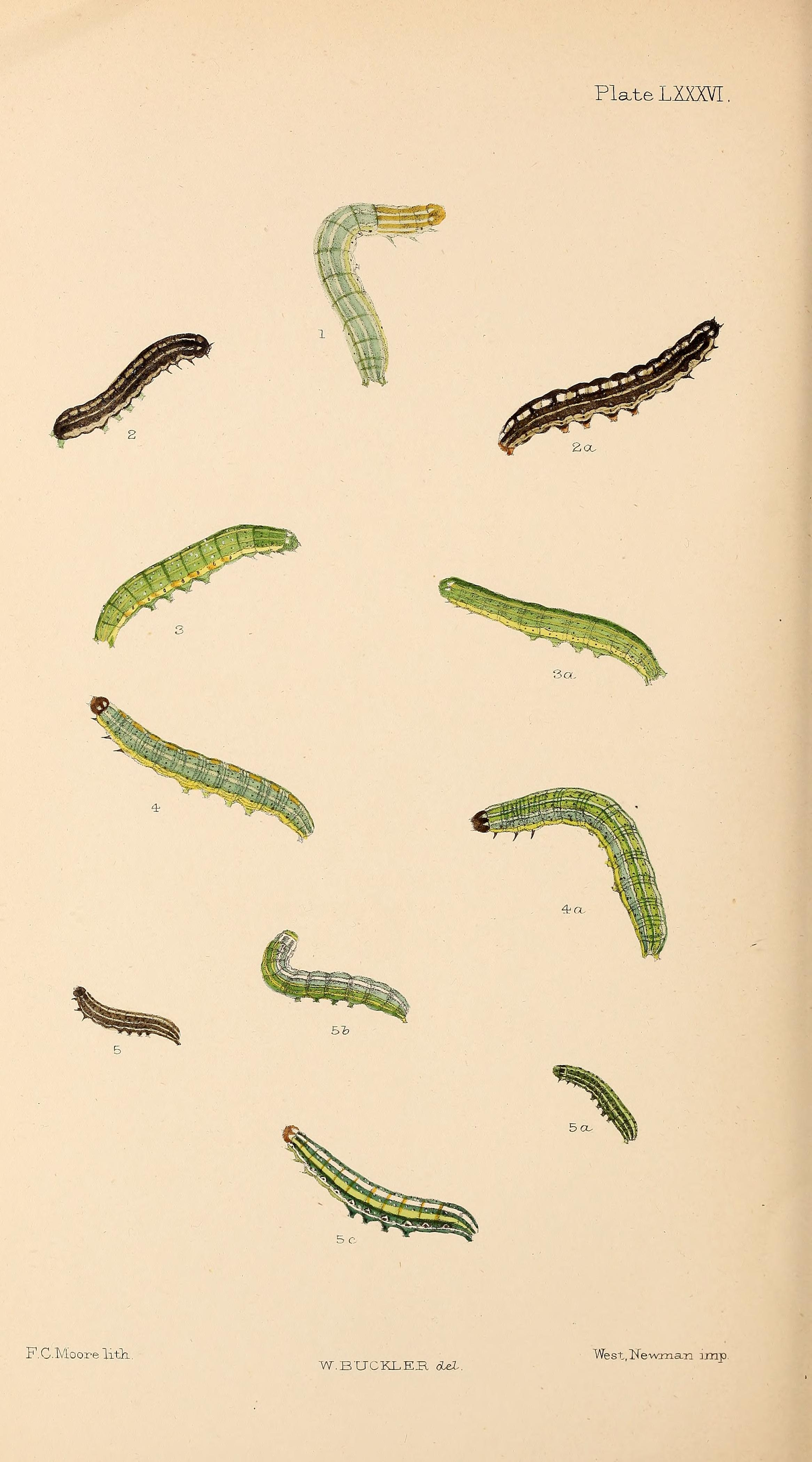
5, 5a, 5b, 5c larvae in various stages

== Biology ==
Adults are on wing from June to August in one generation.

The larvae primarily feed on united leaves of Ulmus species, but have also been recorded on Quercus, Tilia and Prunus spinosa.
