= Corythea =

Corythea may refer to:

- Acalypha (syn. Corythea), a genus of flowering plants in the family Euphorbiaceae
- Thera (moth) (syn. Corythea), a genus of moth of the family Geometridae
