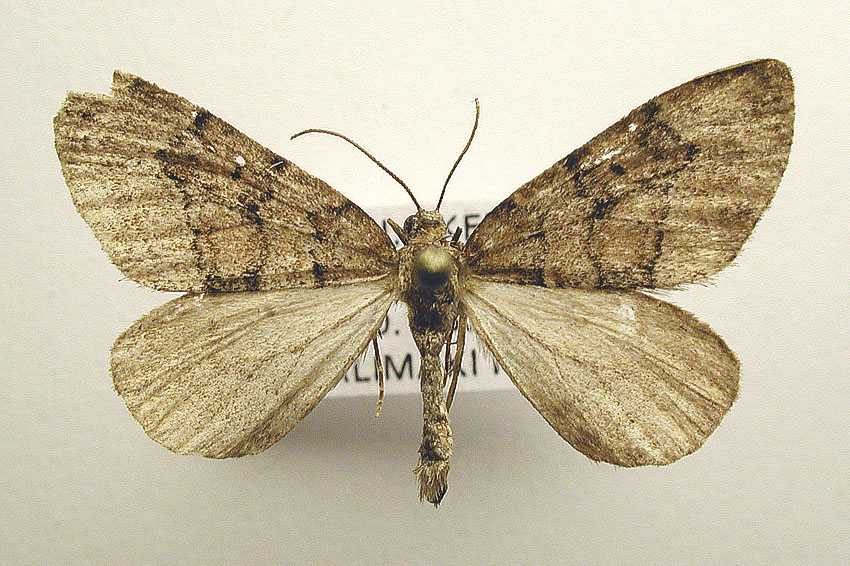

Scientific classification
- Domain: Eukaryota
- Kingdom: Animalia
- Phylum: Arthropoda
- Class: Insecta
- Order: Lepidoptera
- Family: Geometridae
- Genus: Thera
- Species: T. cognata

Binomial name
- Thera cognata (Thunberg, 1792)

Synonyms
- Geometra cognata Thunberg, 1792; Chesias geneata Feisthamel, 1835; Thera coniferata

= Thera cognata =

Species of moth

Thera cognata, the chestnut-coloured carpet or Durham juniper moth, is a moth of the family Geometridae. The species was first described by Carl Peter Thunberg in 1792. It is found in Europe, Asia Minor, the Caucasus and Transcaucasus.

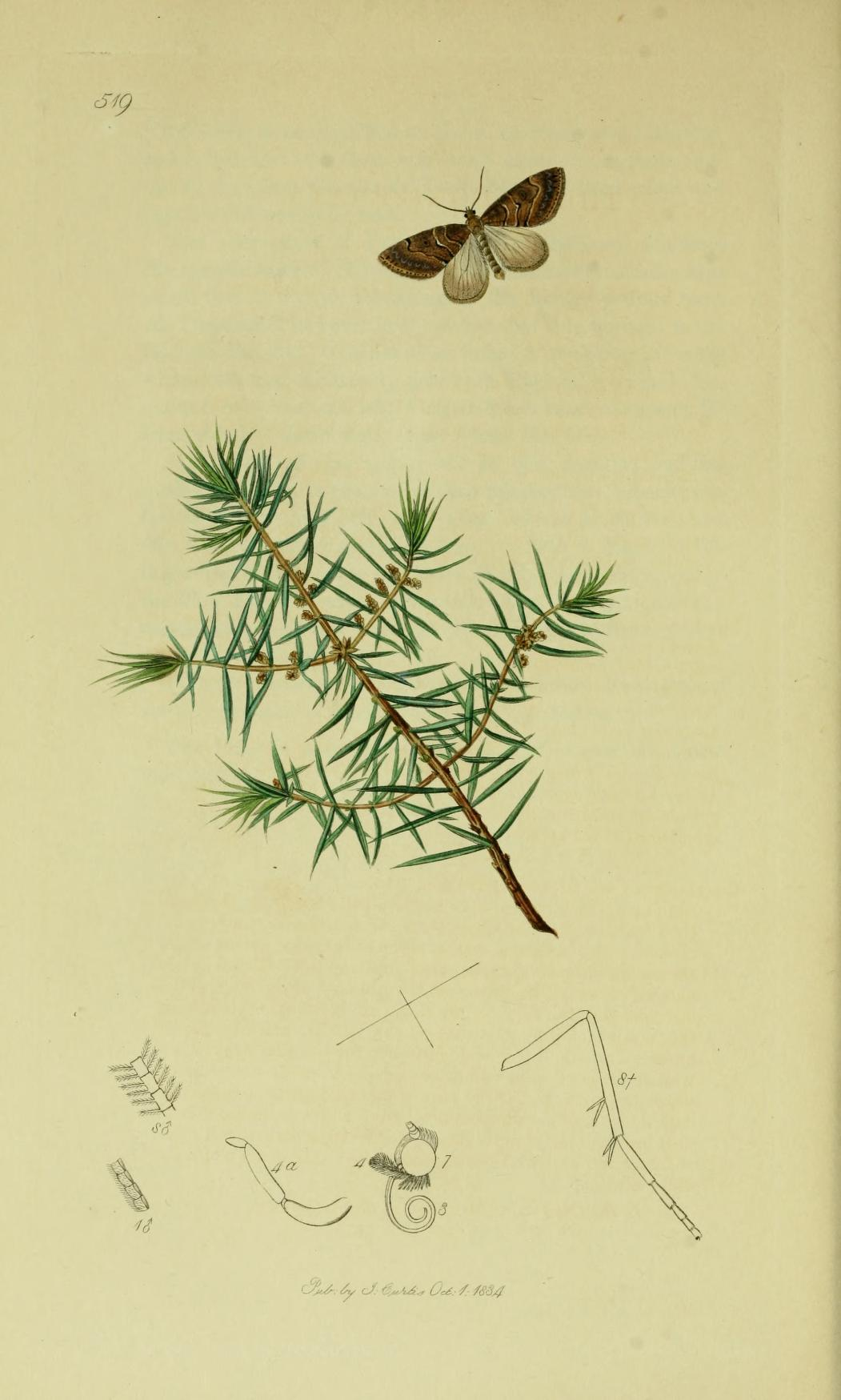
Illustration from John Curtis's British Entomology Volume 6

== Description ==
The wingspan is 26–30 mm. The forewings are reddish brown. The median band and the basal field are darker in colour and these dark fields are delimited with black and white crosslines. The hindwings are whitish. Thera cognata is easily distinguished from Thera variata by its strong purple-brown or red-brown gloss. Hindwing a little more glossy than in Thera obeliscata. The typical northern form is rather small and in general dark reddish. - geneata Feisth., the prevailing form in the Alps and in Transcaucasia, perhaps also in the Pyrenees, is larger, somewhat paler and with a less definite red tinge, the ground colour being somewhat mixed with violet or purplish. — ab. perversa Hirschke is an aberration of geneata, from the Franzenshohe, in which the basal and median areas of the forewing, instead of being darker than the ground colour of the wings, are lighter. The larva is naked, light green with white longitudinal stripes.

== Similar species ==
Itself variable Thera cognata closely resembles some forms of Thera obeliscata In case of doubt, specialists should be consulted for determination.

== Biology ==
Adults are on wing from July to August in one generation.

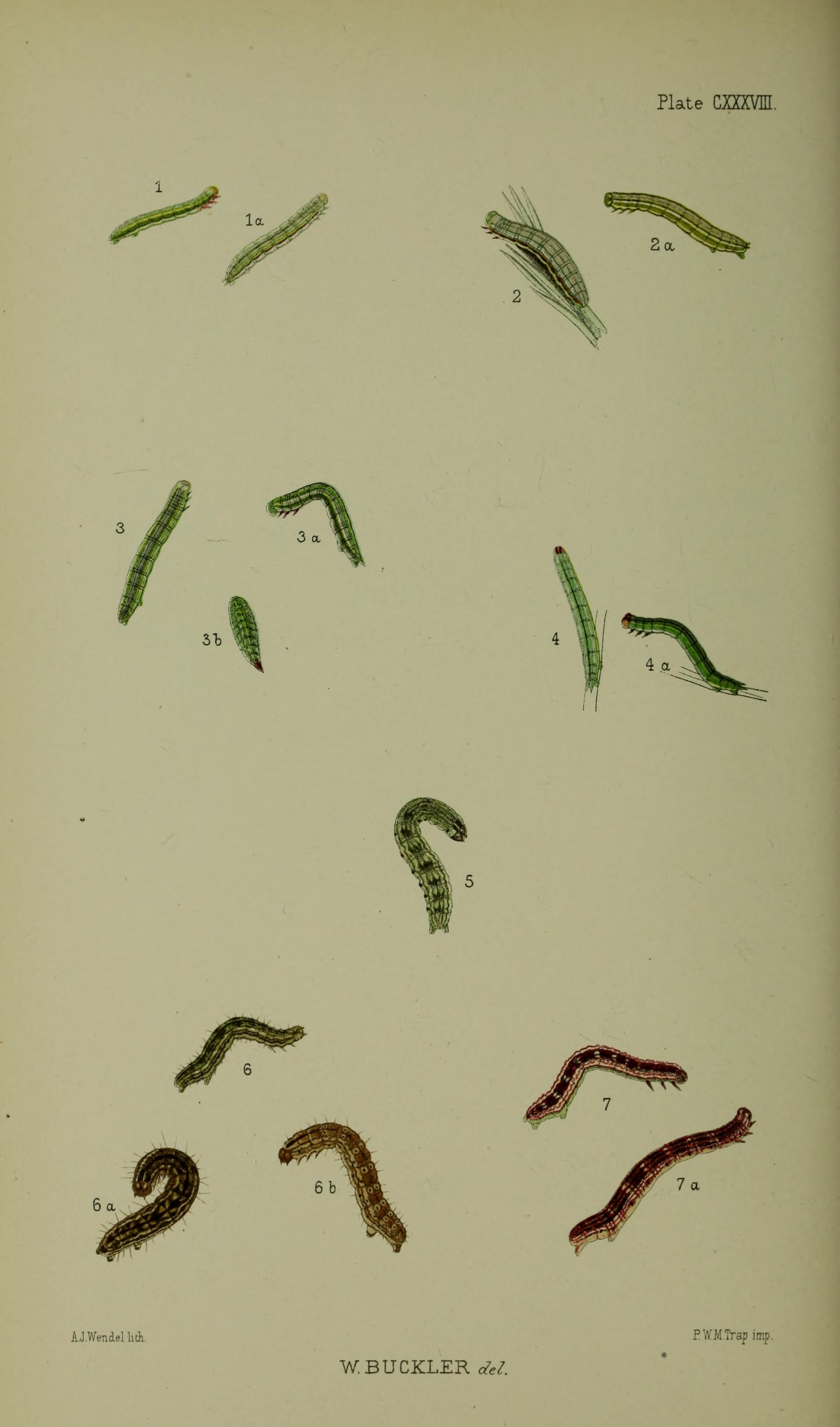
Figs 2, 2a larvae after final moult

The larvae feed on Juniperus species.

== Subspecies ==
- Thera cognata cognata
- Thera cognata geneata (Feisthamel, 1835)
