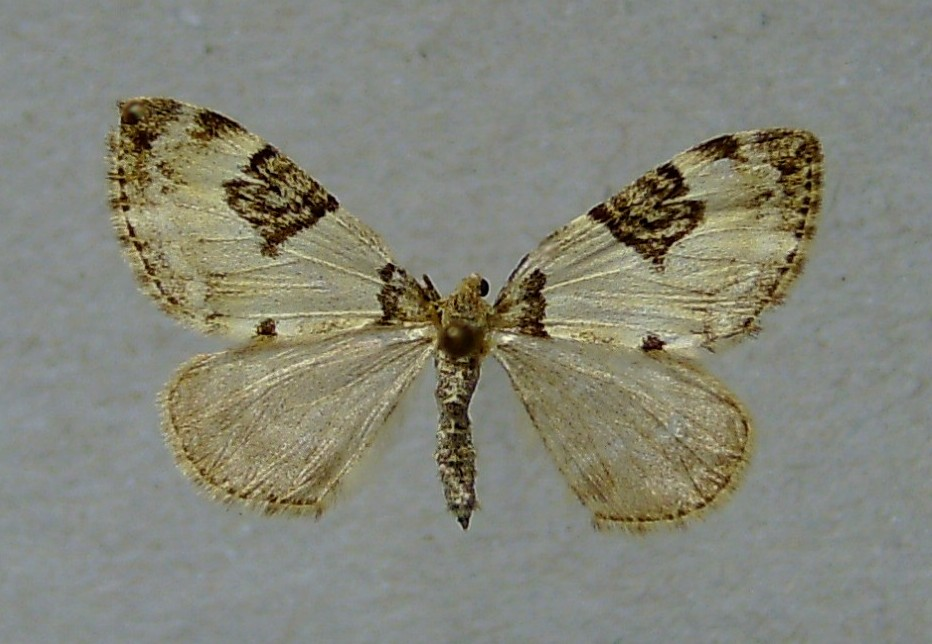

Scientific classification
- Kingdom: Animalia
- Phylum: Arthropoda
- Clade: Pancrustacea
- Class: Insecta
- Order: Lepidoptera
- Family: Geometridae
- Genus: Thera
- Species: T. vetustata

Binomial name
- Thera vetustata (Denis & Schiffermüller, 1775)

Synonyms
- Geometra vetustata Denis & Schiffermuller, 1775; Geometra stragulata Hubner, 1809

= Thera vetustata =

Species of moth

Thera vetustata is a moth of the family Geometridae. It is found from Spain through Central Europe to the Balkan Peninsula. It is not found in Fennoscandia. In the Alps it is found up to altitudes of 1,600 meters.

The wingspan is 24–30 mm. Adults are on wing from the end of May to mid July and again from mid August to mid September. There are two generations per year.

The larvae feed on Abies alba. The species overwinters in the larval stage.

== Taxonomy ==
The species was described as an individual form of Thera variata.
