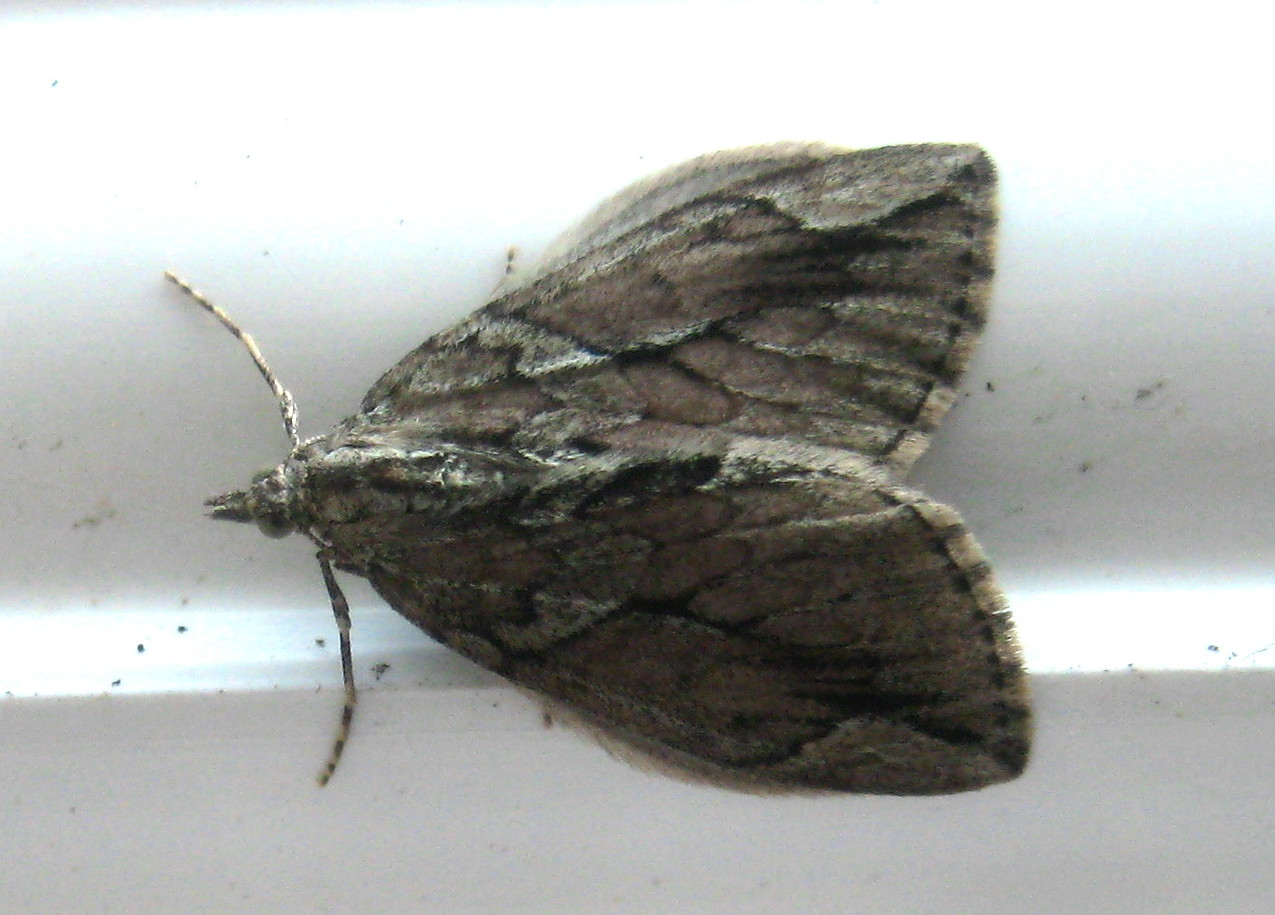

Scientific classification
- Domain: Eukaryota
- Kingdom: Animalia
- Phylum: Arthropoda
- Class: Insecta
- Order: Lepidoptera
- Family: Geometridae
- Genus: Thera
- Species: T. cupressata

Binomial name
- Thera cupressata (Geyer, 1831)

Synonyms
- Geometra cupressata Geyer, 1831

= Thera cupressata =

Cypress carpet

Species of moth

Thera cupressata, the cypress carpet, is a moth of the family Geometridae. It is found in southern and western Europe, including Great Britain, Germany, France, Switzerland, Italy, Slovenia, Croatia, Greece and Spain.

The wingspan is 28–32 mm. Adults are on wing from May to June and again from August to September in two generations per year.

In southern England the larvae feed on Cupressus macrocarpa and Cupressocyparis leylandii. In France they eat Cupressus sempervirens, Cupressus macrocarpa and Juniperus sabina.
