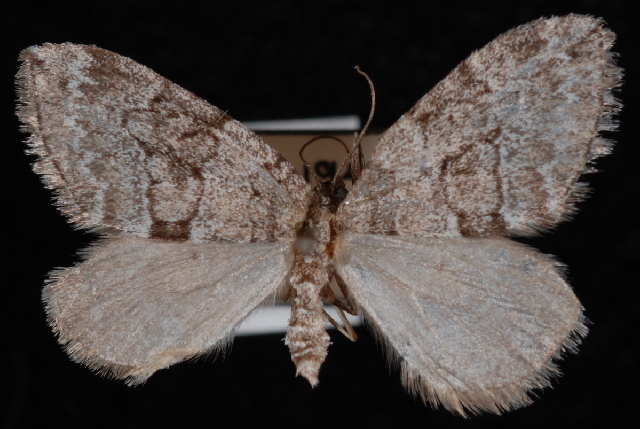

Scientific classification
- Kingdom: Animalia
- Phylum: Arthropoda
- Class: Insecta
- Order: Lepidoptera
- Family: Geometridae
- Genus: Thera
- Species: T. otisi

Binomial name
- Thera otisi (Dyar, 1904)

= Thera otisi =

Species of moth

Thera otisi is a species of geometrid moth in the family Geometridae. It is found in North America.

The MONA or Hodges number for Thera otisi is 7219.
