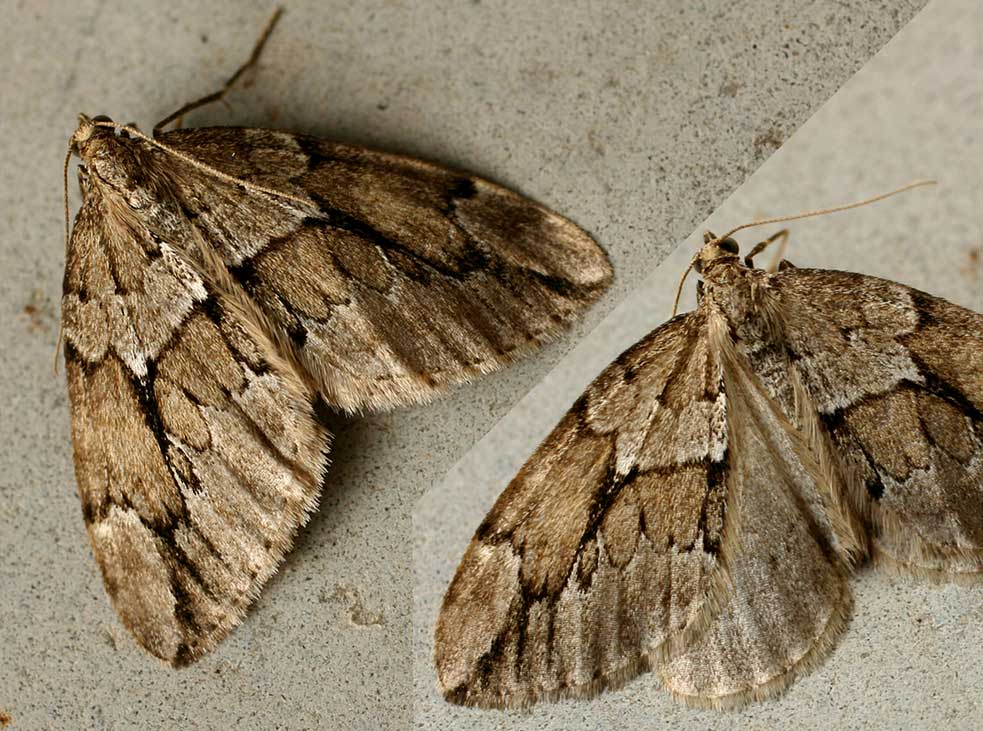

Scientific classification
- Kingdom: Animalia
- Phylum: Arthropoda
- Clade: Pancrustacea
- Class: Insecta
- Order: Lepidoptera
- Family: Geometridae
- Genus: Thera
- Species: T. juniperata

Binomial name
- Thera juniperata (Linnaeus, 1758)

= Juniper carpet =

Species of moth

The juniper carpet (Thera juniperata) is a moth of the family Geometridae. The species was first described by Carl Linnaeus in his 1758 10th edition of Systema Naturae. It is found throughout Europe and the Near East, but is rather uncommon and locally distributed, mainly due to its very specific larval food plant.

== Description ==
The nominate race has a wingspan of 26–29 mm but smaller races occur in Ireland and Scotland. The forewings are light brown with a darker shaded band and a very distinctive black apical streak. The hindwings are pale buff. The caterpillars reach a length of up to 21 millimeters, are light green and have an indistinct, bluish-green dorsal line. The also not clearly pronounced dorsolateral lines are greenish or whitish. The wide, yellowish-white lateral line is lined red at the top. The legs are rosy, the head is round and greenish-brown. The pupa is slim, light green to grey-brown. It has six hook bristles on the cremaster, which is relatively short.

== Similar species ==
Itself variable Thera juniperata closely resembles some forms of Thera obeliscata In case of doubt, specialists should be consulted for determination.

== Biology ==
The moth is active at night from September to November, but rarely flies any great distance though it occasionally comes to light.

The larva feeds exclusively on junipers. The species overwinters as an egg.

1. The flight season refers to the British Isles. This may vary in other parts of the range.

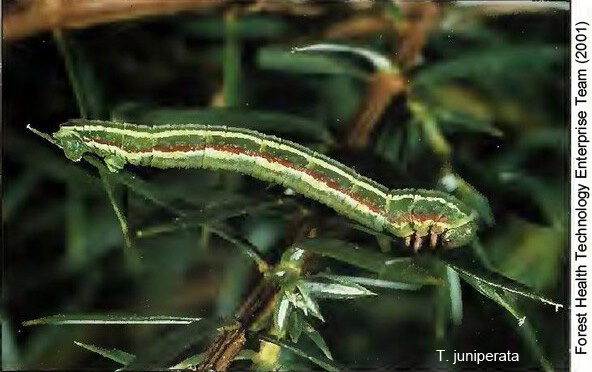
Thera juniperata caterpillar
