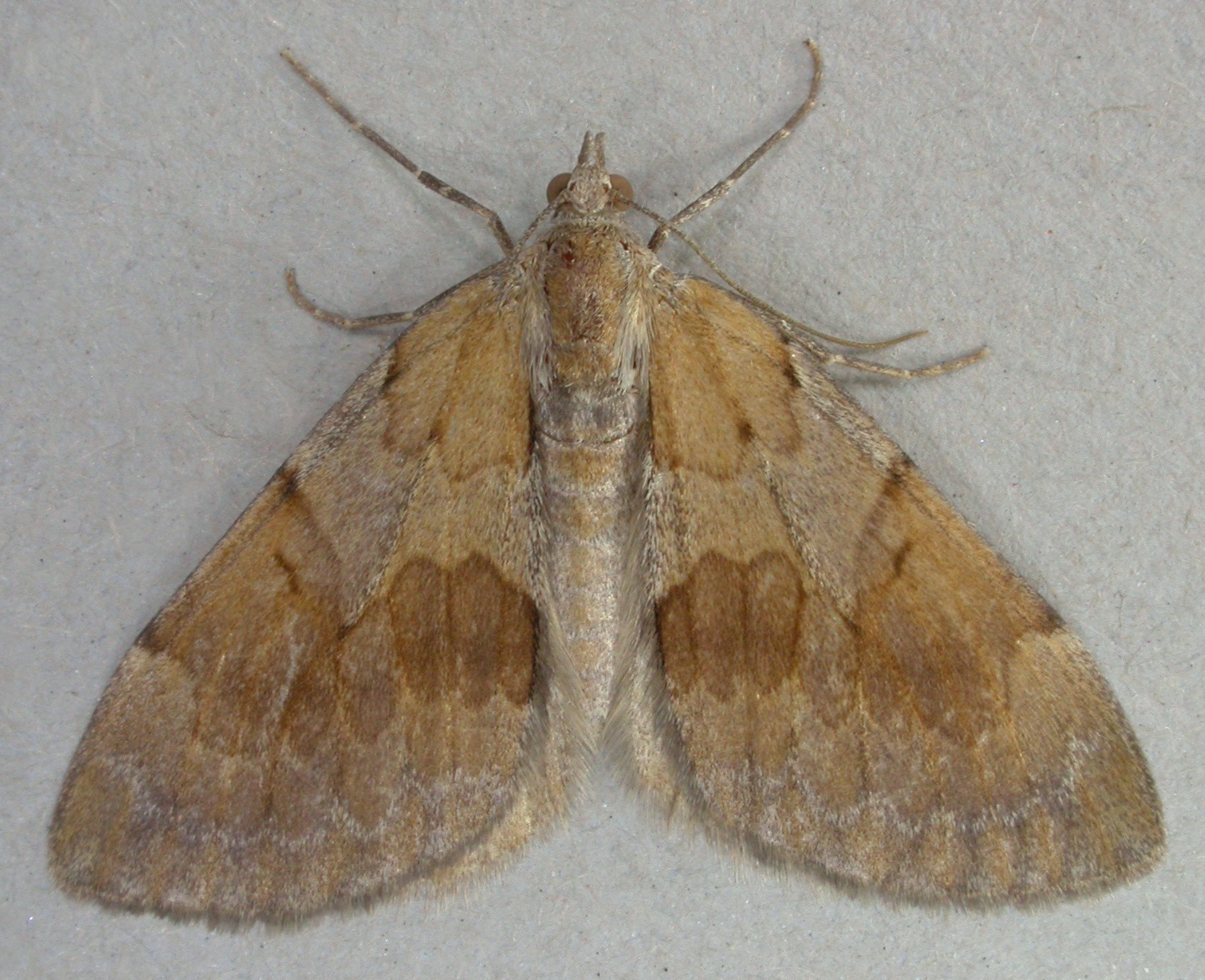

Scientific classification
- Domain: Eukaryota
- Kingdom: Animalia
- Phylum: Arthropoda
- Class: Insecta
- Order: Lepidoptera
- Family: Geometridae
- Genus: Thera
- Species: T. firmata

Binomial name
- Thera firmata Hübner, 1822

Synonyms
- Pennithera firmata

= Thera firmata =

Species of moth

Thera firmata, the pine carpet, is a moth of the family Geometridae. It is found throughout Europe, Anatolia and countries bordering the Caucasus Mountains.

== Description ==
The length of the forewings is 13–16 mm. The ground colour of the forewings is reddish grey. There is with a darker midfield band, indented on the inner edge. The basal field is usually the same colour as the band. The hindwing is whitish brown. "It is sometimes, though quite unnecessarily, confused with the brightest reddish forms of obeliscata. Apart from the pectinate male antenna (2 pairs of rather short, slender pectinations to each segment) the paler, more yellowish-tinged hindwing, pale abdomen with red-brown dorsal line, dark subbasal mark along the hindmargin, more deeply angulated antemedian line, more bluish white (or violet-white) subterminal line, usually accompanied by some slight violet-grey shading, and absence of black apical dash all distinguish it. The typical form, which varies very little, inhabits Northern Central Europe, Switzerland and Austria-Hungary. ulicata Rbr., from S. France, Castile and Lower Austria, has the ground-colour predominantly of the pale violet-grey or blue-grey tone and the median band darkened."

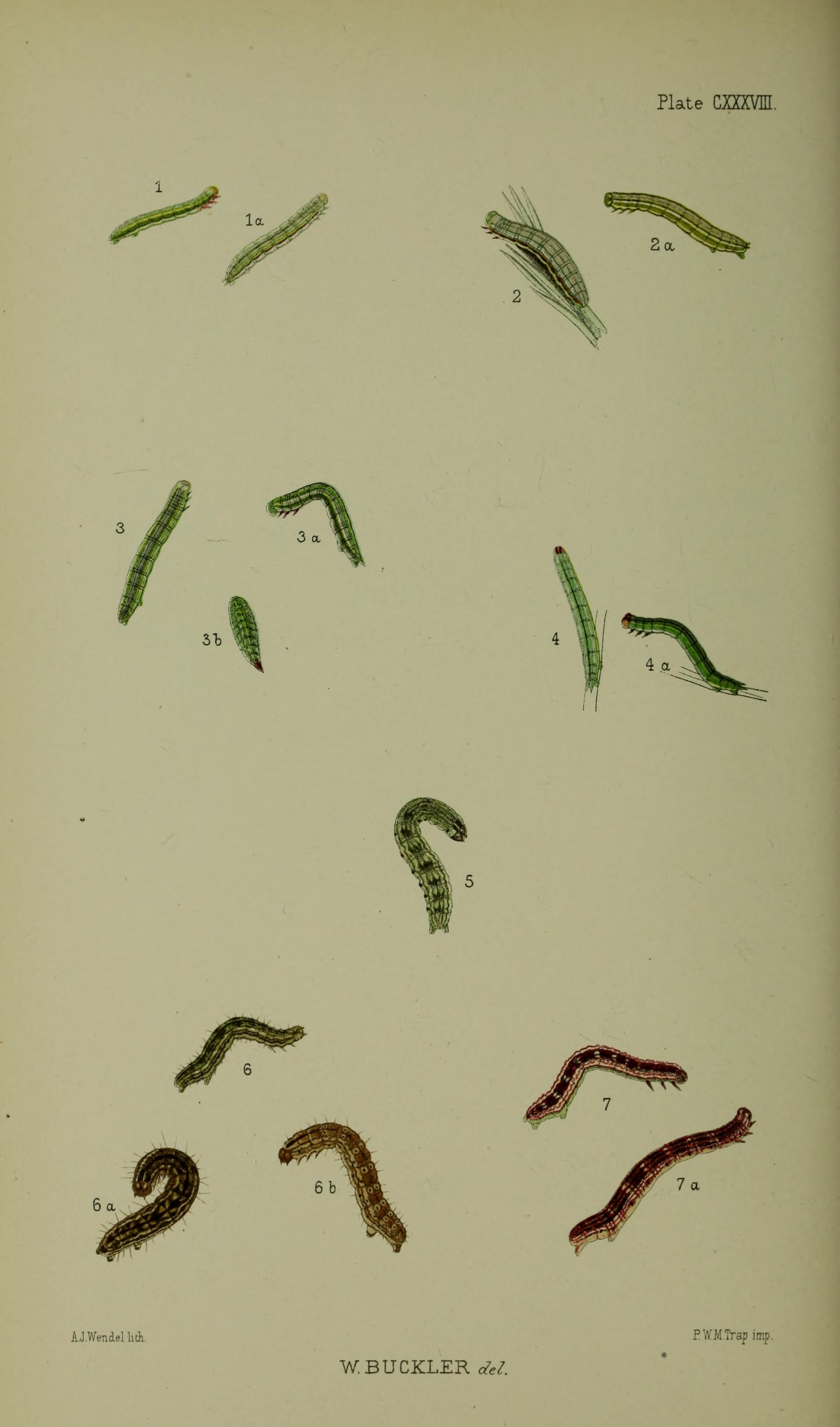
Figs 4, 4a larvae after final moult

The larva is naked, long and thin, green with narrow, light longitudinal stripes.

== Similar species ==
Itself variable Thera firmata closely resembles some forms of Thera obeliscata In case of doubt, specialists should be consulted for determination.

== Biology ==
The moth flies in two generations from August to mid October.

The larva feeds on pine.

== Notes ==
1. The flight season refers to Belgium and The Netherlands. This may vary in other parts of the range.
