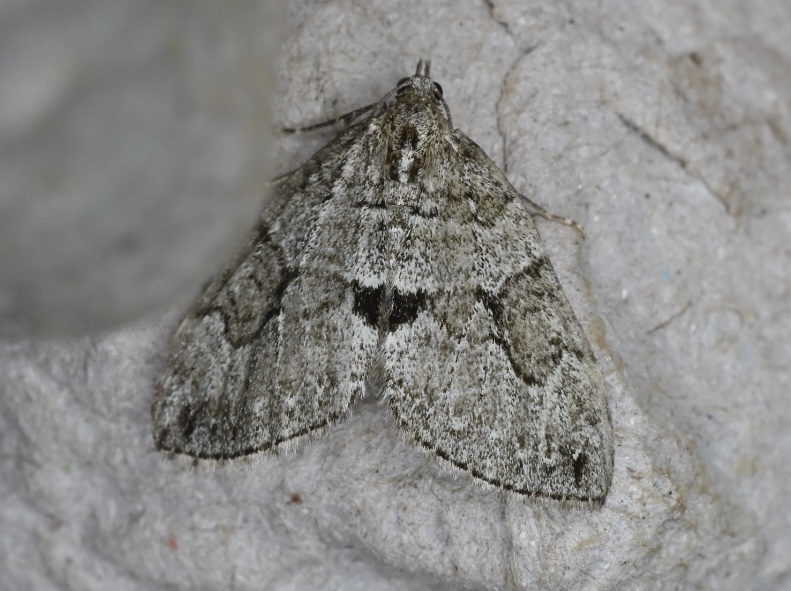

Scientific classification
- Kingdom: Animalia
- Phylum: Arthropoda
- Clade: Pancrustacea
- Class: Insecta
- Order: Lepidoptera
- Family: Geometridae
- Genus: Thera
- Species: T. contractata

Binomial name
- Thera contractata (Packard, 1873)

= Thera contractata =

Species of moth

Thera contractata, known generally as the contracted spanworm or evergreen spanworm, is a species of geometrid moth in the family Geometridae. It is found in North America.

The MONA or Hodges number for Thera contractata is 7218.
