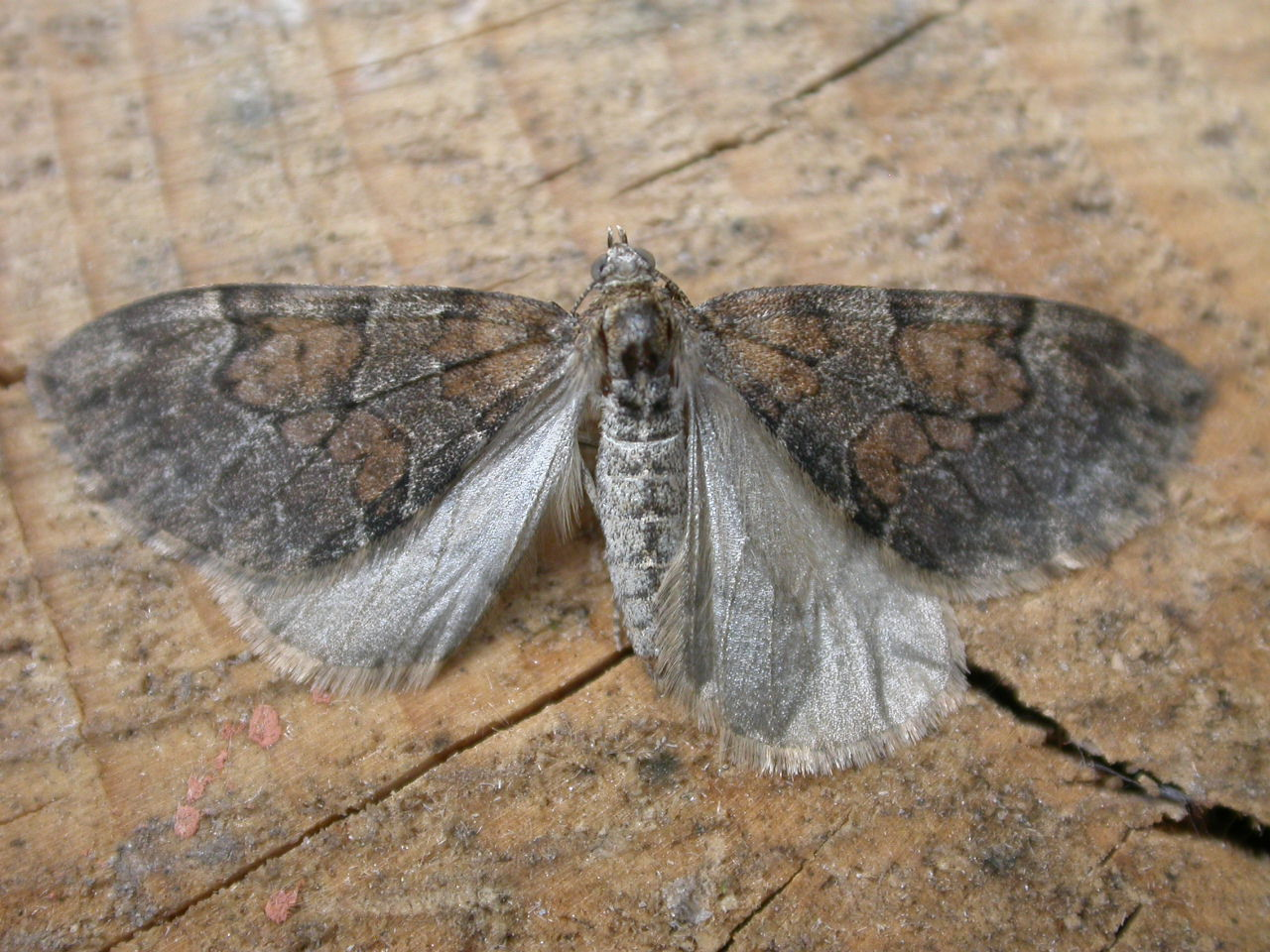

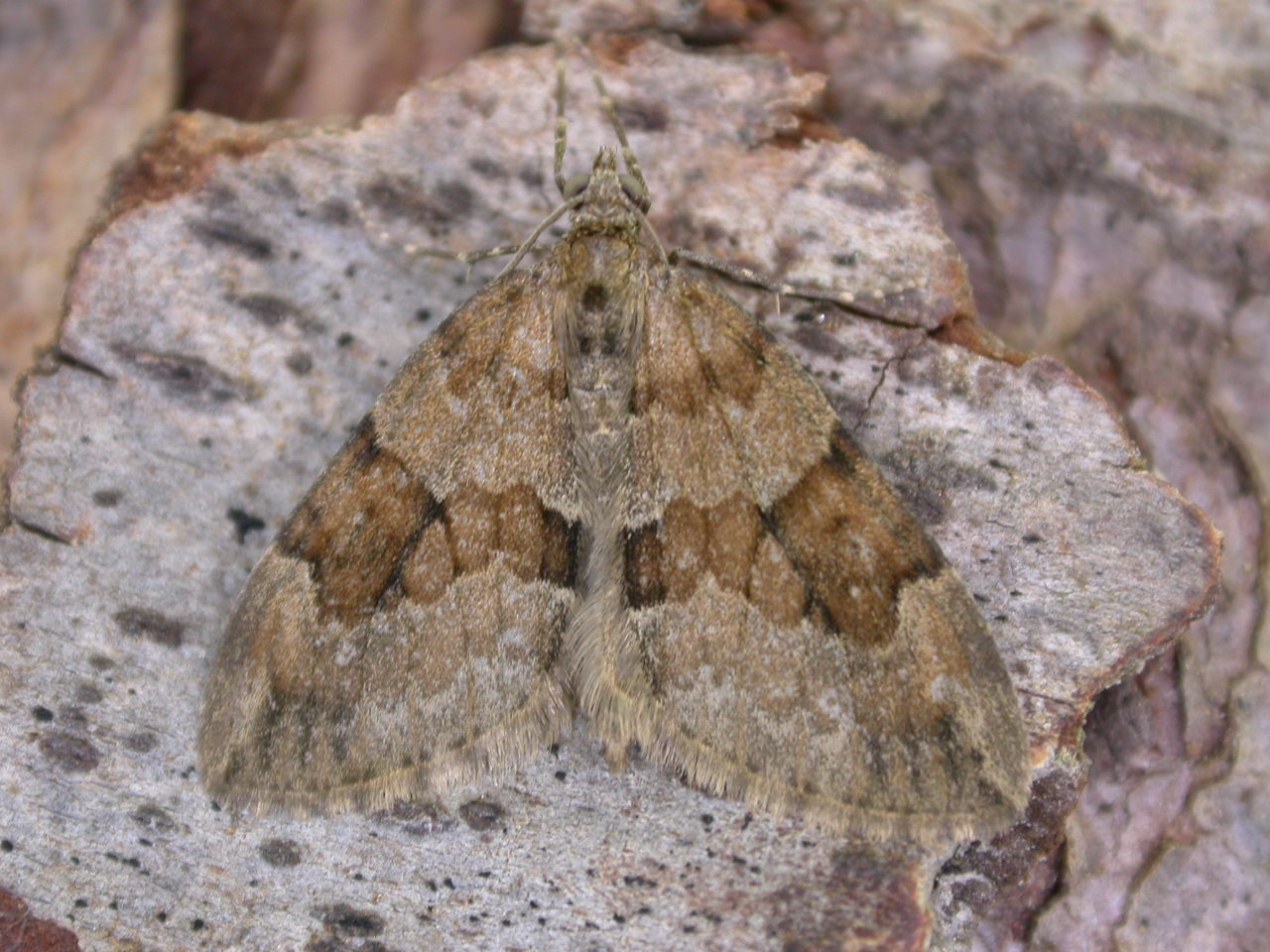

Scientific classification
- Domain: Eukaryota
- Kingdom: Animalia
- Phylum: Arthropoda
- Class: Insecta
- Order: Lepidoptera
- Family: Geometridae
- Genus: Thera
- Species: T. obeliscata

Binomial name
- Thera obeliscata (Hübner, 1787)

= Thera obeliscata =

Grey pine carpet

Species of moth

Thera obeliscata, the grey pine carpet, is a moth of the family Geometridae. It is found throughout north and central Europe and east across the Palearctic to Siberia, and south to the Caucasus and Transcaucasia. In the Alps it can be found at an altitude of over 1500 metres.

== Description ==
The wingspan is 28–36 mm. Forewing reddish brown or fulvous, the distal edge of the median band not strongly indented, or with only one deep indentation (on the fold); pale subterminal line commonly obsolete, or if present, not strongly dentate. Hindwing rather more glossy and brownish than that of Thera variata, the discal dot generally altogether obsolete on the upperside, though expressed beneath. — ab. tristrigaria Donov. is an infrequent aberration with three unusually well developed, elongate interneural submarginal streaks between the 5th subcostal and 3rd radial veins. The aberration, ab. mediolucens Rossi, is a rather striking form in which the ground-colour is appreciably darkened while the median band remains fulvous, thus appearing lighter, or at least brighter, than the adjoining areas. — ab. obliterata B. White is almost unicolorous brown-black or black-brown in Britain and occasionally in the mountains of Central Italy. It is difficult to certainly distinguish Thera obeliscata from Thera britannica See Townsend et al. The egg has an elongated shape and is yellowish to greenish coloured. The surface is divided by grooves into irregular fields filled with small warts. Adult caterpillars are coloured green. They show white-yellow dorsolateral lines and lateral stripes. At the rear end there are two small tips. The greenish or brownish pupa is covered with whitish or yellowish longitudinal lines. The tip has a reddish-brown colour.

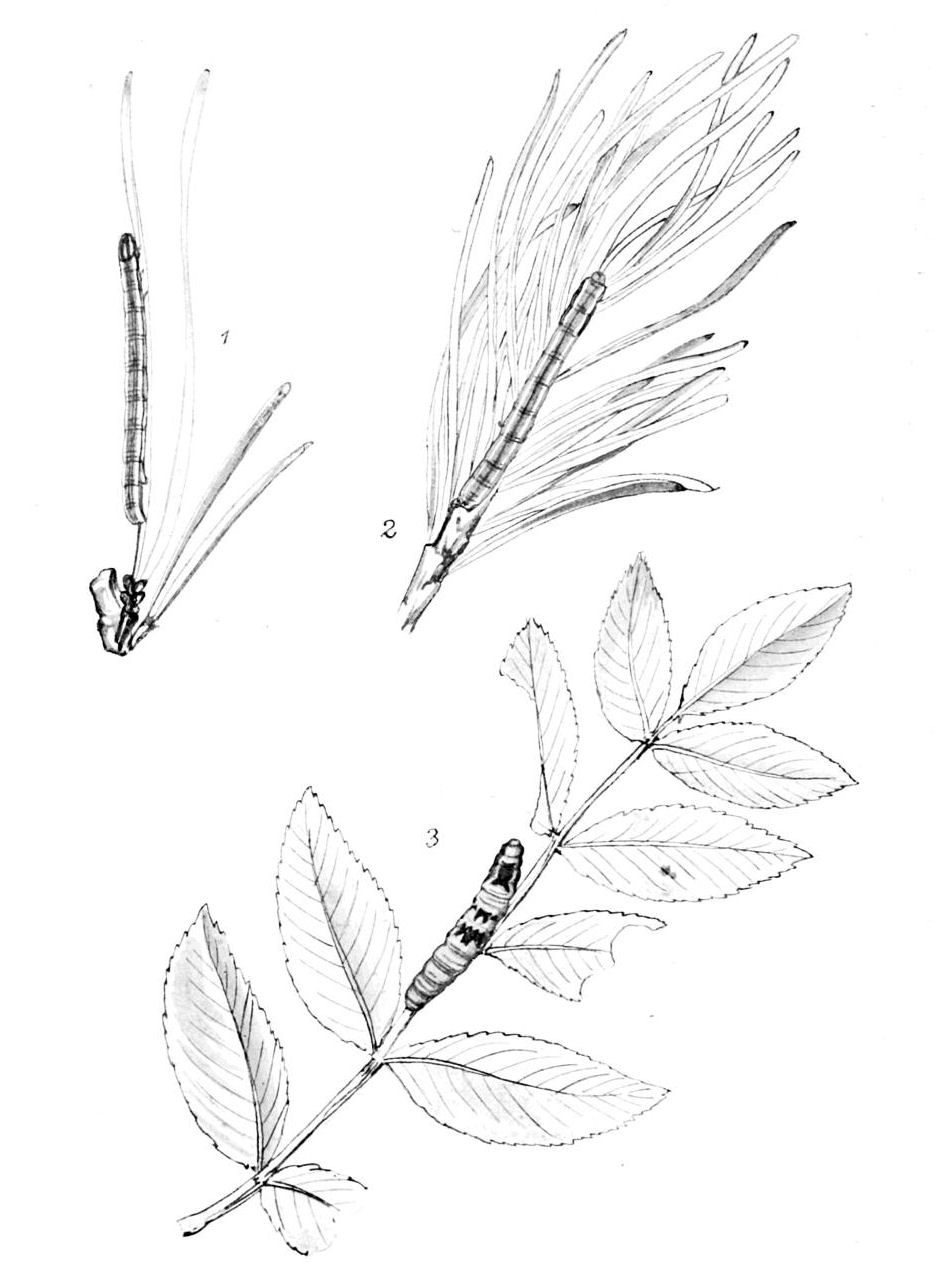
Larva Figure 1

== Similar species ==
Due to the great colour variability and the similar pattern elements Thera variata, Thera britannica, Thera cognata, Thera juniperata, Pennithera firmata as well as Thera cembrae and Pennithera ulicata are sometimes difficult to distinguish from some forms of Thera obeliscata. In case of doubt, specialists should be consulted for determination.

== Biology ==
The larva primarily feeds on Pinus sylvestris and Norway spruce Picea abies. The species prefers settled pine forests.
