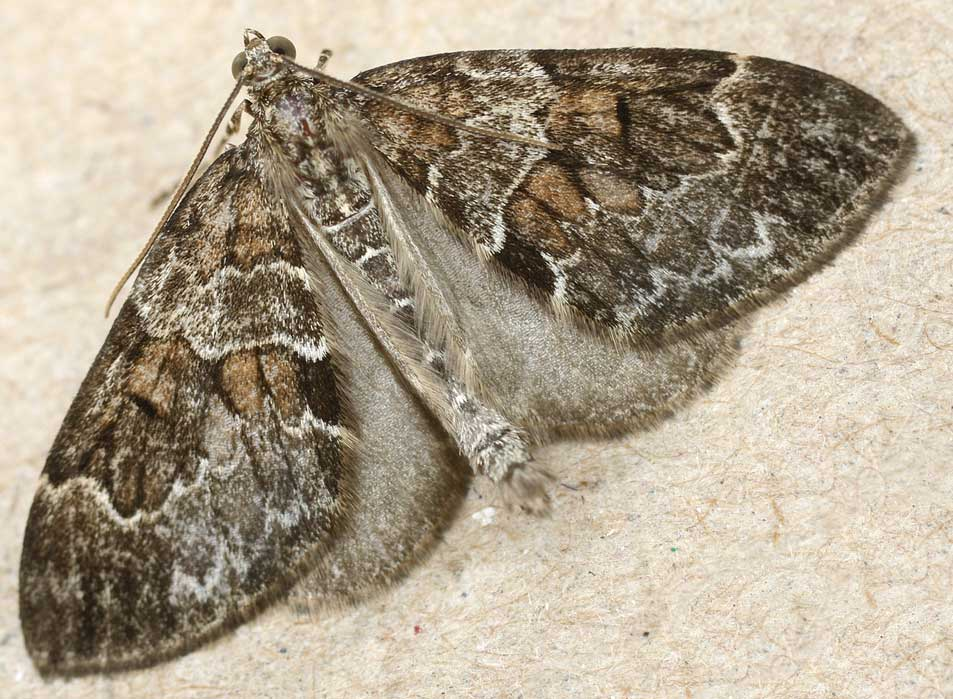

Scientific classification
- Kingdom: Animalia
- Phylum: Arthropoda
- Clade: Pancrustacea
- Class: Insecta
- Order: Lepidoptera
- Family: Geometridae
- Genus: Thera
- Species: T. britannica

Binomial name
- Thera britannica (Turner, 1925)

= Spruce carpet =

Species of moth

The spruce carpet (Thera britannica) is a moth in the family Geometridae. The species was first described by Alfred Jefferis Turner in 1925. It is a double-brooded species, meaning it has two broods in one year. Its wings are coloured with different shades of grey, but the spring brood tends to have more brown colours.

== Distribution ==
Thera britannica is found in several regions across Europe. This includes the British Isles and France, Scandinavia, and Central Europe to the north of the Carpathian Mountains. In the south, there are isolated occurrences in the Pyrenees, Corsica, the Italian peninsula, the Carpathians, the mountains of Greece (including Peloponnese), and Bulgaria. The species is more common than in the southern areas in the northern regions of the Alps.

Additional sightings of Thera britannica have been confirmed northwest and northeast of Turkey, Transcaucasia, and the Caucasus.

== Description ==
The wingspan of Thera britannica is about 30–36 mm (1.2–1.4 in). While it closely resembles the grey pine carpet, it is usually more richly marked and greyer in appearance. The ground colour of the forewing varies from light grey to blackish grey. Within the median band, there are individual dark-brown and reddish-brown stains (shapes) which are often marked with a white border. Three or more of these shapes are ovoid areas located towards the trailing edge. The median band is fluted and normally edged narrowly with white. The sub-terminal line is generally well marked. The spring brood is an overall brown rather than grey. Important differential characters are the white marginal line to central band, the distinct sub-terminal line and the dark grey-brown hindwings.

== Similar species ==
Itself variable, Thera britannica closely resembles some forms of Thera obeliscata.

== Biology ==
Its flight periods are April to late June (spring brood) and from the end of August to mid-October (autumn brood). The larva feeds on Picea abies and Pseudotsuga menziesii.
