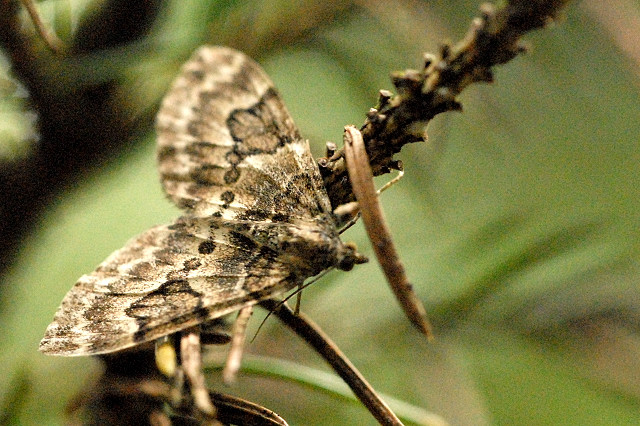

Scientific classification
- Domain: Eukaryota
- Kingdom: Animalia
- Phylum: Arthropoda
- Class: Insecta
- Order: Lepidoptera
- Family: Geometridae
- Genus: Thera
- Species: T. variata

Binomial name
- Thera variata (Denis & Schiffermüller, 1775)

= Thera variata =

Spruce carpet

Species of moth

Thera variata, the spruce carpet, is a moth of the family Geometridae. It is found throughout Europe, North Asia and Japan. The common name spruce carpet is also used when referring to Thera britannica.

The length of the forewings is 13–17 mm. The forewings are light ochreous-brown, sprinkled with dark fuscous with an ochreous-brown basal patch the edge waved, right-angled above middle. The median band is ochreous-brown or dark fuscous, black-marked on veins, edges dark fuscous, sometimes whitish-margined its anterior angulated in middle and its posterior waved, right-angled above middle. There is a black discal mark, a subterminal line obscurely whitish and a cloudy darker apical dash. The hindwings are pale fuscous, ochreous tinged with a darker discal dot and sometimes a curved postmedian line. The larva is blue-green; dorsal line darker, pale edged; subdorsal yellowish-white, posteriorly yellow; subspiracular yellowish-white; segment 13 with two points.

== Similar species ==
Itself variable, Thera variata closely resembles some forms of Thera obeliscata. In case of doubt, specialists should be consulted for determination.

== Biology ==
The moth flies in two generations from mid April to mid October.

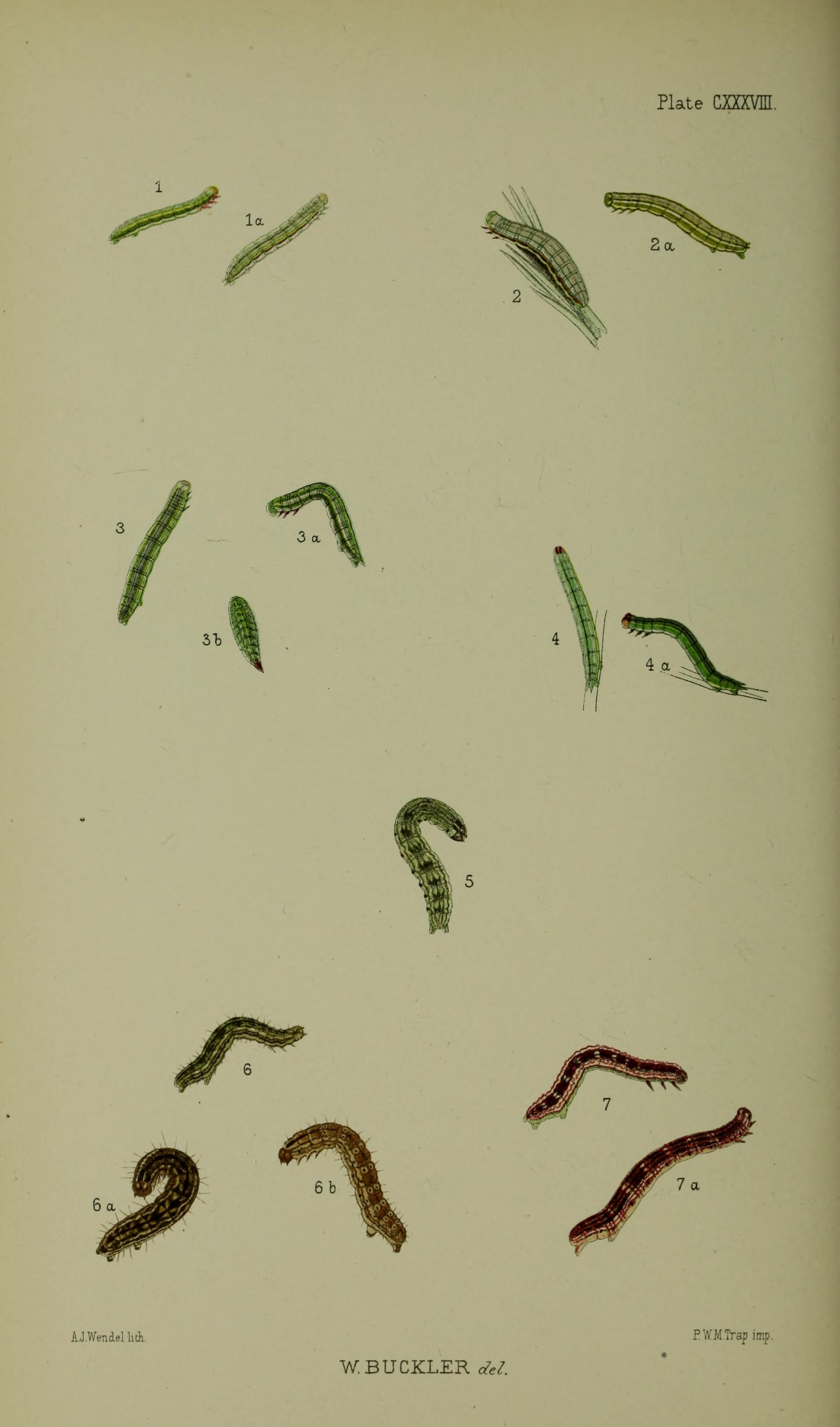
Figs Figs 3,3a larvae after final moult 3b pupa

The larva feeds on spruce and other Pinophyta.

== Notes ==
1. The flight season refers to Belgium and The Netherlands. This may vary in other parts of the range.
