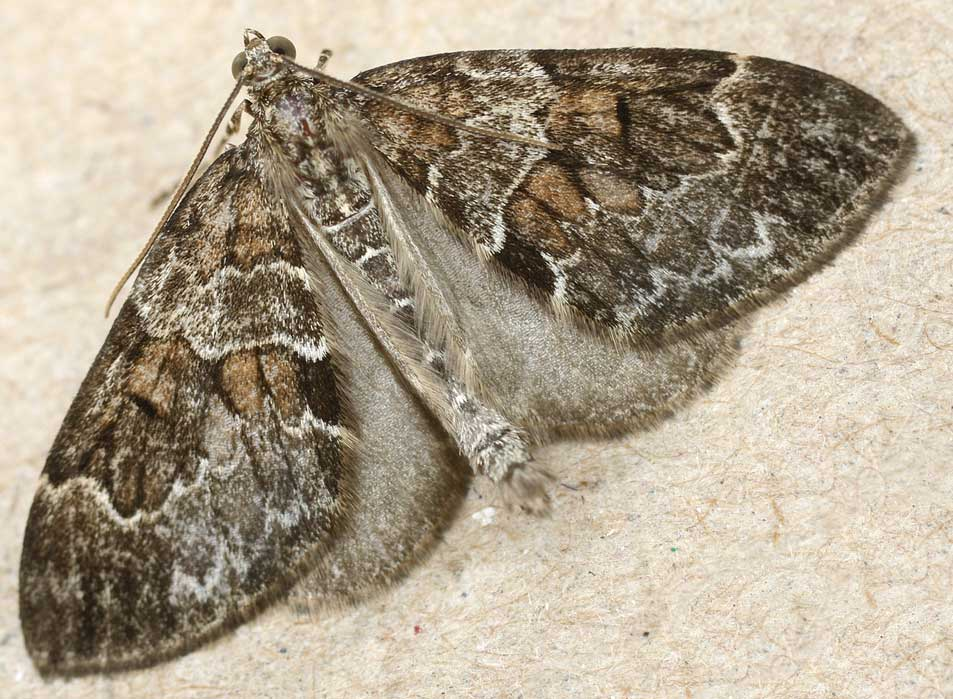
- Thera britannica

Scientific classification
- Domain: Eukaryota
- Kingdom: Animalia
- Phylum: Arthropoda
- Class: Insecta
- Order: Lepidoptera
- Family: Geometridae
- Tribe: Cidariini
- Genus: Thera; Stephens, 1831

Synonyms
- Corythea Duponchel, 1845

= Thera (moth) =

Genus of moths

Thera is a genus of moths of the family Geometridae erected by James Francis Stephens in 1831.

== Selected species ==
- Thera britannica (Turner, 1925) – spruce carpet
- Thera cembrae (Kitt, 1912)
  - Thera cembrae cembrae (Kitt, 1912)
  - Thera cembrae mugo Burmann & Tarmann, 1983
- Thera cognata (Thunberg, 1792)
  - Thera cognata cognata (Thunberg, 1792)
  - Thera cognata geneata (Feisthamel, 1835)
- Thera contractata (Packard, 1873)
- Thera cupressata (Geyer, 1831)
- Thera firmata (Hübner, 1822)
  - Thera firmata consobrinata Curtis, 1834
  - Thera firmata firmata (Hübner, 1822)
  - Thera firmata tavoilloti Mazel, 1998
- Thera juniperata (Linnaeus, 1758) – juniper carpet
- Thera latens Barnes & McDunnough, 1917
- Thera obeliscata (Hübner, 1787)
- Thera otisi (Dyar, 1904)
- Thera ulicata (Rambur, 1934)
- Thera variata (Denis & Schiffermüller, 1775)
  - Thera variata balcanicola de Lattin, 1951
  - Thera variata variata (Denis & Schiffermüller, 1775)
- Thera variolata (Staudinger, 1899)
- Thera vetustata (Denis & Schiffermüller, 1775)
