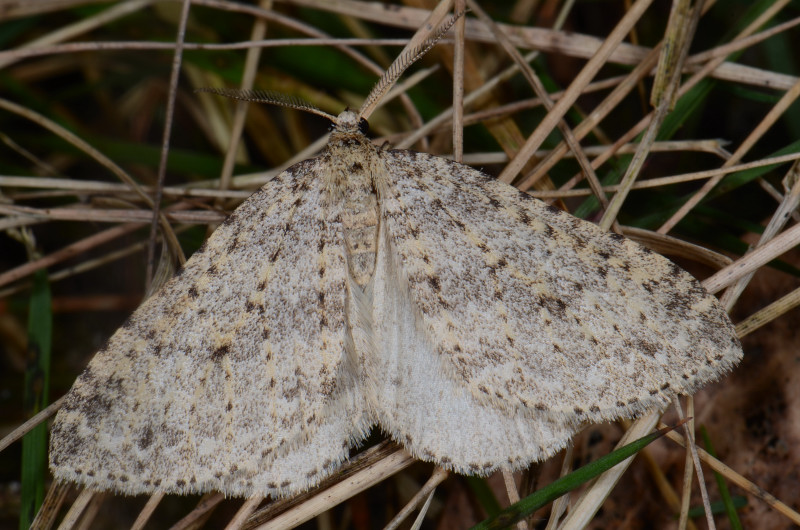

Scientific classification
- Domain: Eukaryota
- Kingdom: Animalia
- Phylum: Arthropoda
- Class: Insecta
- Order: Lepidoptera
- Family: Geometridae
- Genus: Colostygia
- Species: C. multistrigaria

Binomial name
- Colostygia multistrigaria (Haworth, 1809)

Synonyms
- Geometra multistrigaria Haworth, 1809; Larentia olbiaria Millière, 1865

= Colostygia multistrigaria =

Mottled grey

Species of moth

Colostygia multistrigaria, the mottled grey, is a species of moth in the family Geometridae. It is found in western and south-western Europe and North Africa. The habitat is damp woodlands, heaths, and mosses.

The wingspan is 26–31 millimetres (1.0–1.2 in). The ground colour is grey mottled with brown. The forewings have a weak darker central band. The basal patch, central band, and shade before the whitish submarginal line are also sometimes darker. The hindwings are pale whitish grey.

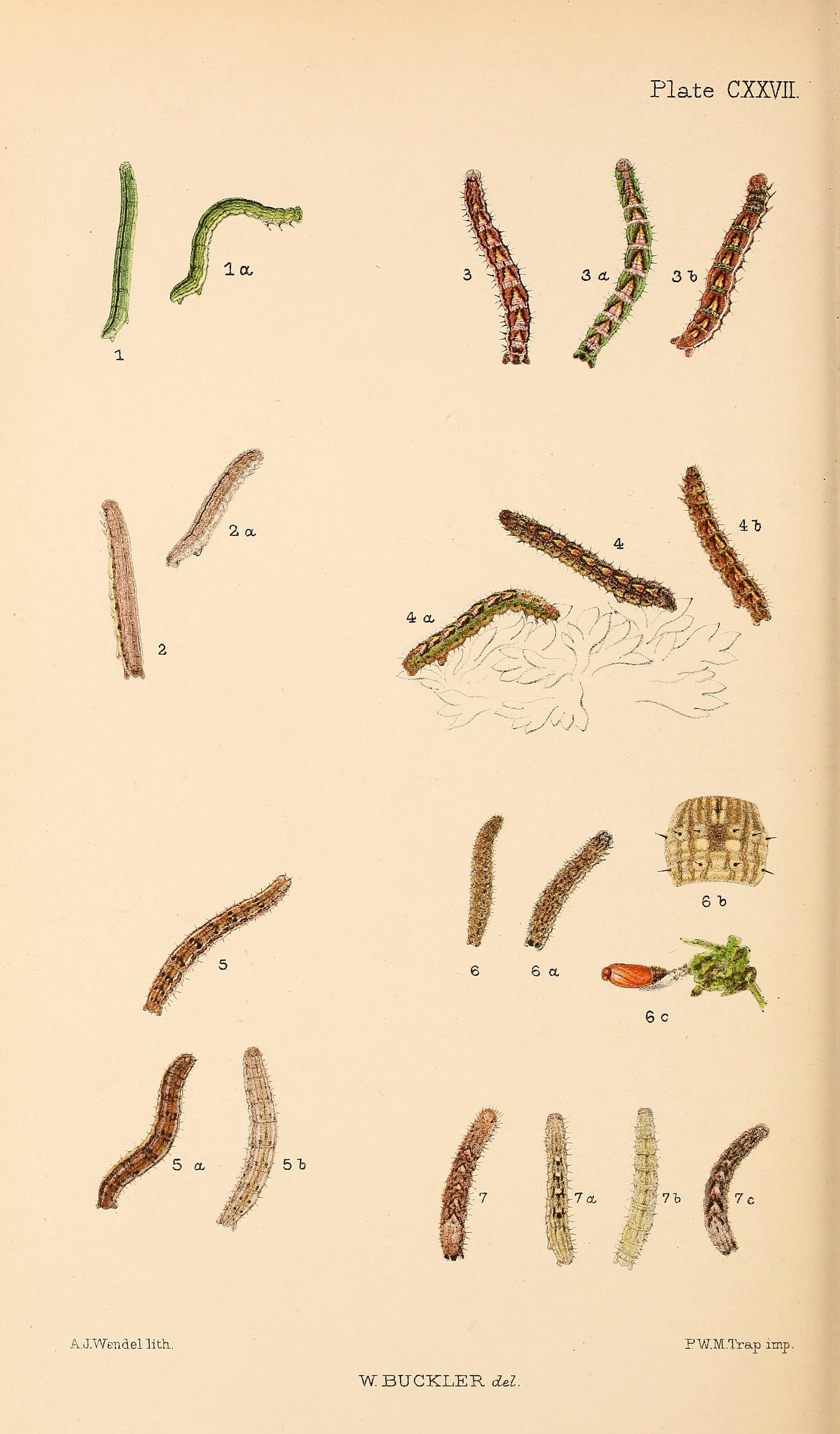
Figs.2,2a larvae after final moult

The caterpillar is ochreous grey, with three brownish lines along the back, and two other lines on each side, the upper one yellowish, wavy, and edged above with dusky. The larva is uniformly cylindrical, brown-grey, tinged with green dorsally, rather paler ventrally. There is a blackish dorsal line, at least on the last few segments. The spiracles are minute, blackish. The pupa is dark reddish, dorsally and anally more black.

Adults are on wing from March to April in one generation per year.

The larvae feed on Galium species. Larvae can be found from March to June. The species overwinters in the pupal stage. About dusk the moths may be seen on the lower parts of fences, tree-trunks, rocks, sitting on grass and other vegetation.

== Subspecies ==
- Colostygia multistrigaria multistrigaria
- Colostygia multistrigaria olbiaria (Milliere, 1865) a paler, weakly-banded race from S. E. France and Catalonia. The dark dots on the veins are as strong as in the name-type and thus appear relatively stronger.
