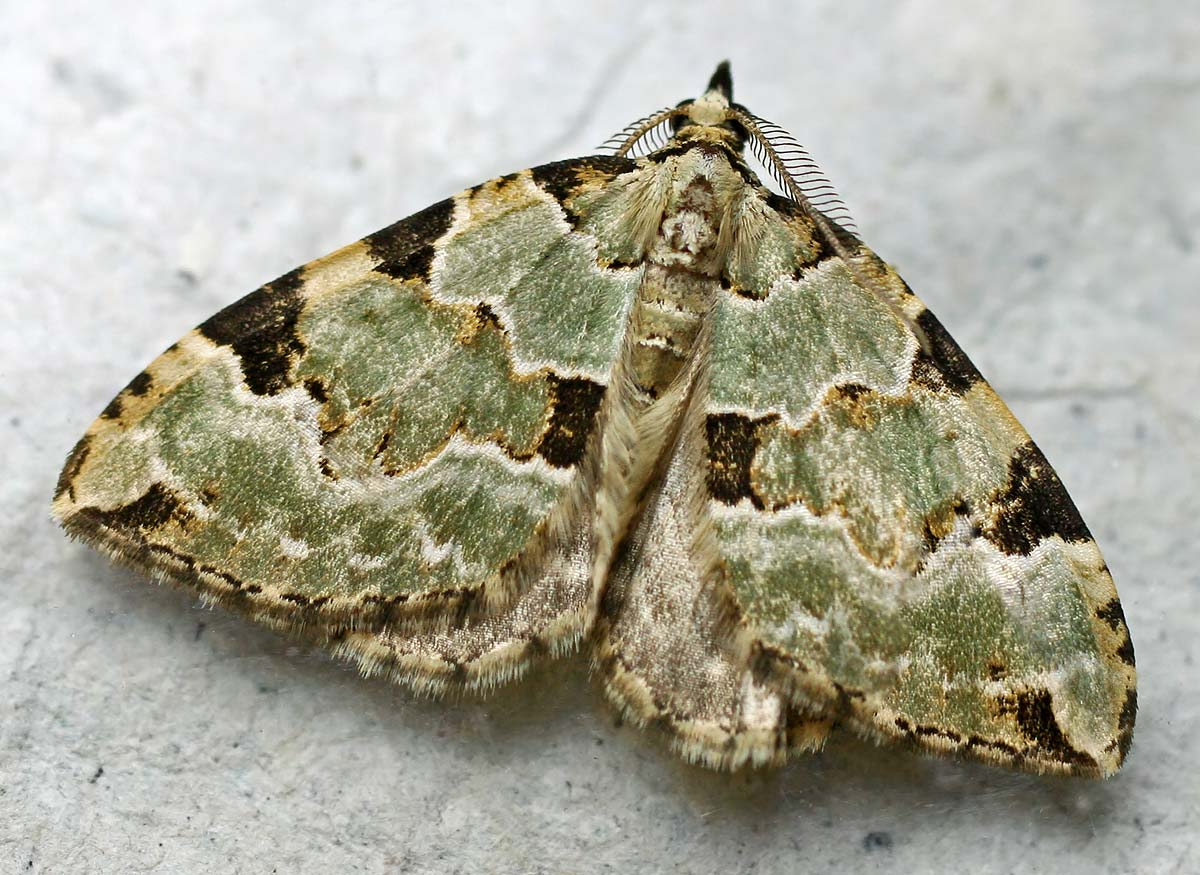

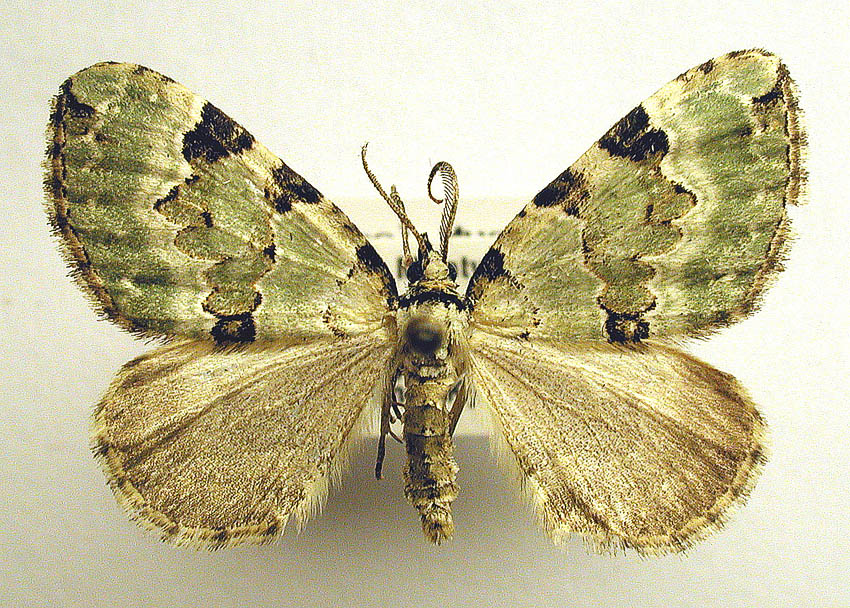

Scientific classification
- Domain: Eukaryota
- Kingdom: Animalia
- Phylum: Arthropoda
- Class: Insecta
- Order: Lepidoptera
- Family: Geometridae
- Genus: Colostygia
- Species: C. pectinataria

Binomial name
- Colostygia pectinataria (Knoch, 1781)

= Colostygia pectinataria =

Green carpet

Species of moth

Colostygia pectinataria, the green carpet, is a Palearctic moth of the genus Colostygia in the family Geometridae. It was first described by August Wilhelm Knoch in 1781.

The moth has a wingspan from 22 to 28 millimetres (0.87 to 1.10 in). The strong forewing ground colour is green to bluish green. The wing pattern shows the following colour sequence: a small region at the wing base brown green, the ensuing basal region brighter green, a wide and strongly serrated on the outside discal region dark green edged with white, the postdiscal region whitish green and the marginal region tinted brownish green. There are two distinct blackish spots near the front edge of the wing (costa) and one on the inner edge. In older specimens, the greenish colour can fade. Sometimes newly emerged hatched moths have a whitish, yellowish or pink colour. The hindwings shimmer grey white and have faint lines. The antennae of the males are combed, those of females are simple. The larva is stout, gnarled and light grey violet in colour. It has numerous small black spots that each carry a short, stiff brush.

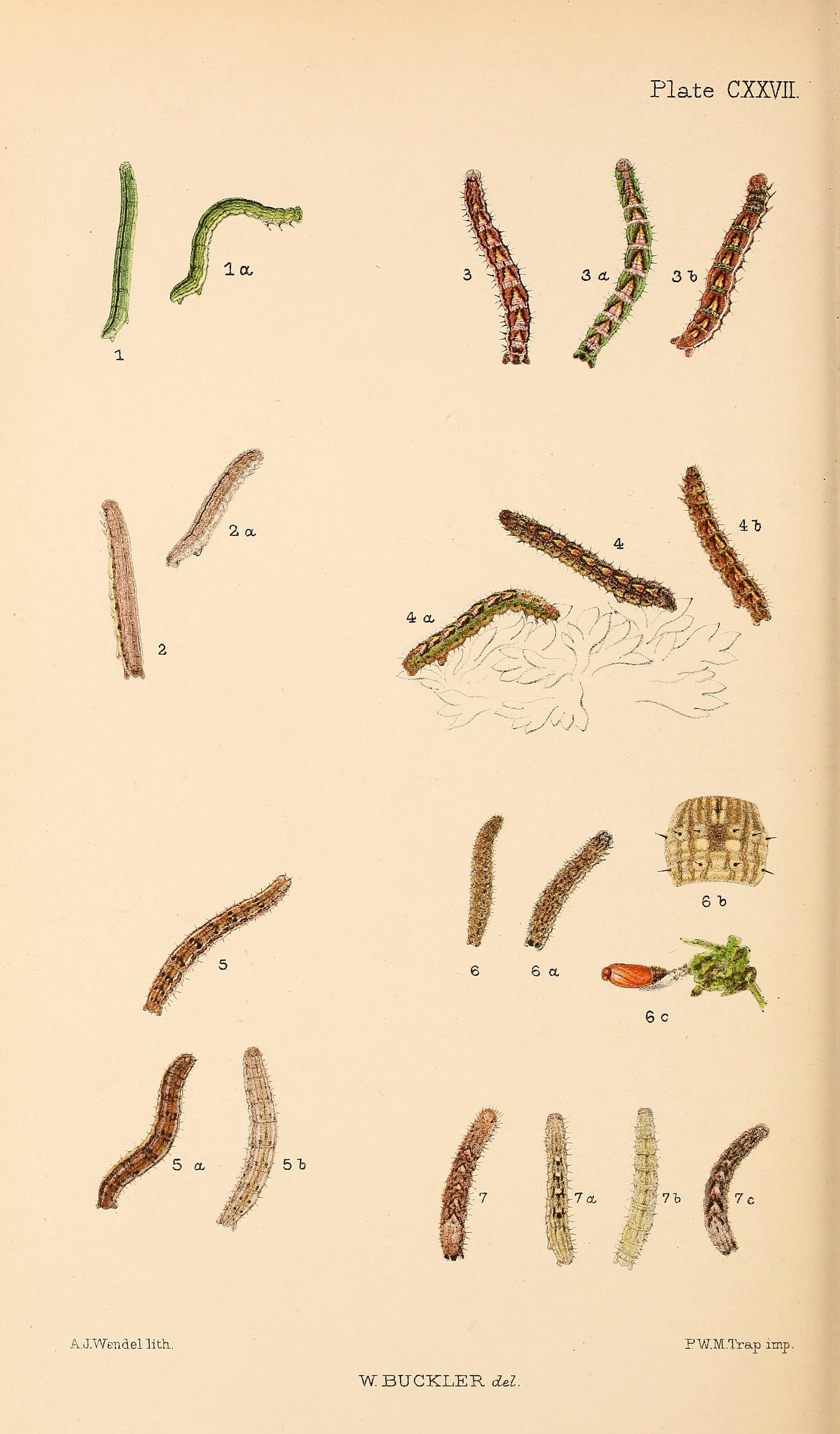
7,7a,7b,7c in various stages

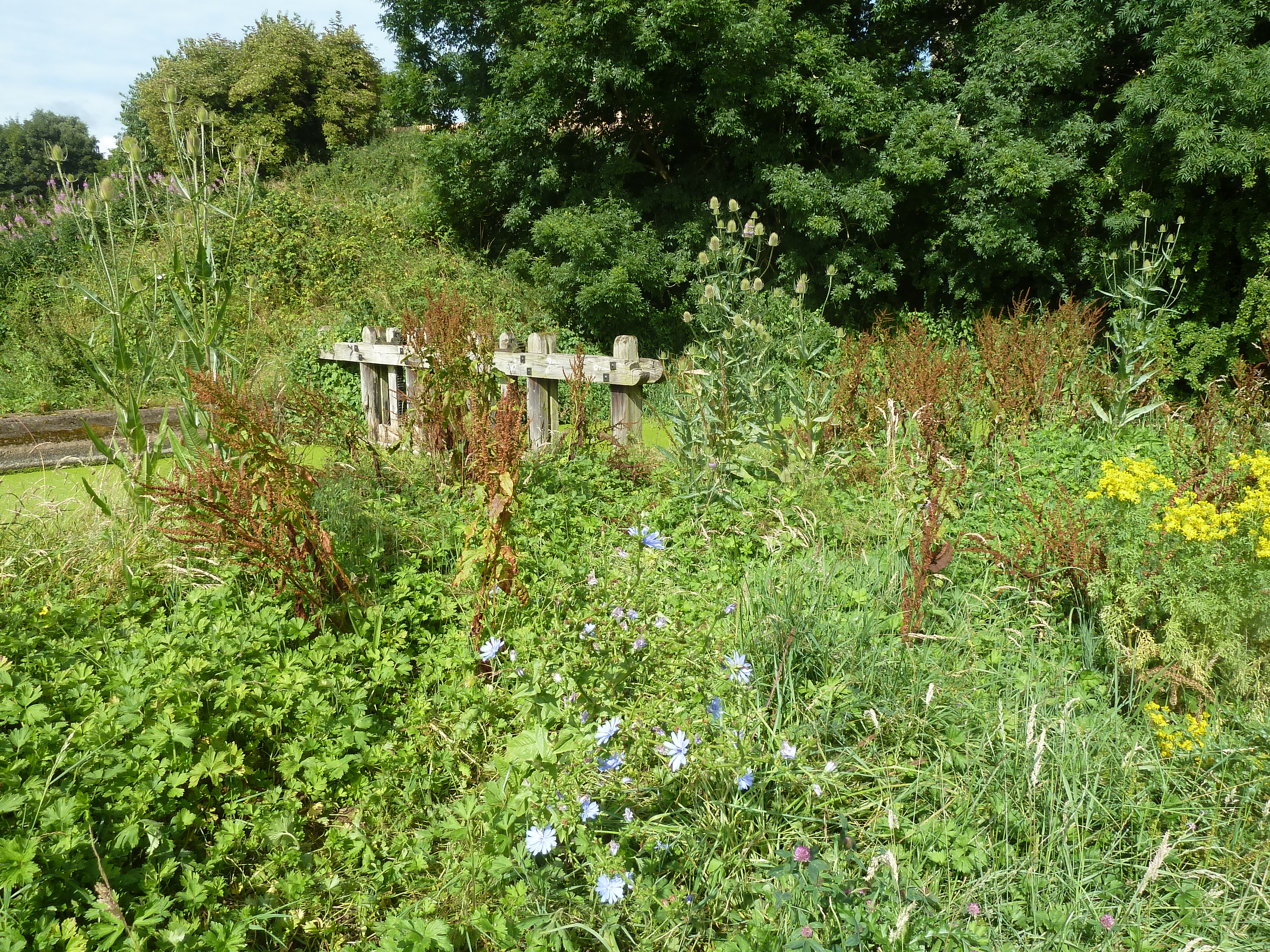
Habitat.Ireland

It occurs in many different biotopes, on moors, in marshy terrain and also in forests. The larvae feed primarily on Galium but also on Rumex and Lamium. The moths fly at night in June – July and often come to light.

It is a Palearctic species found in the Iberian Peninsula over western and central Europe including the British Isles and east to the Altai Mountains. C. pectinataria reaches the Arctic Circle in Fennoscandia, to the south the occurrence ranges from the western Mediterranean to the Balkan Peninsula, the Black Sea region and the Caucasus.

In the mountains C. pectinataria has been recorded at elevations of over 2,000 metres (6,600 ft). Bogs, forests, bushy forest edges and damp heath areas are preferred.
