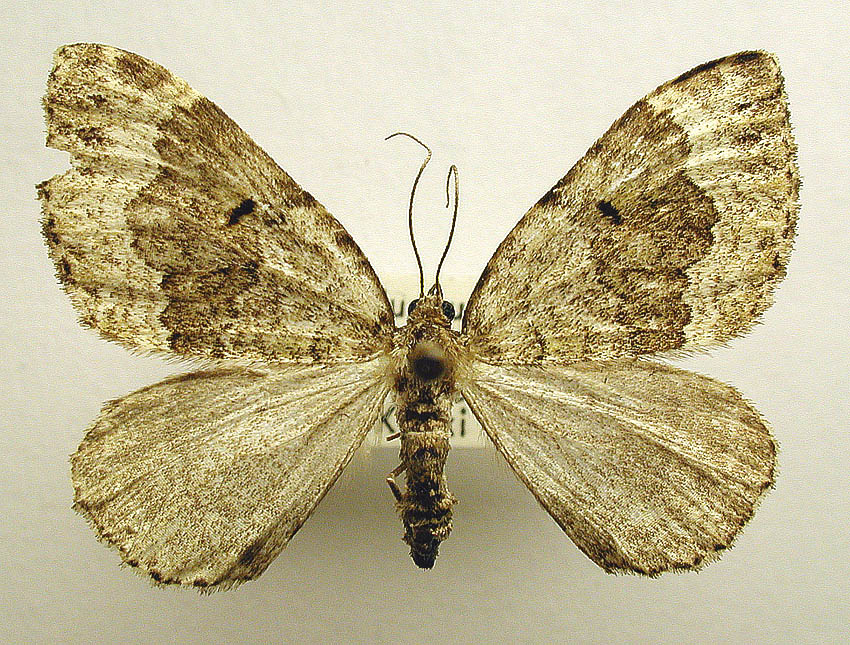

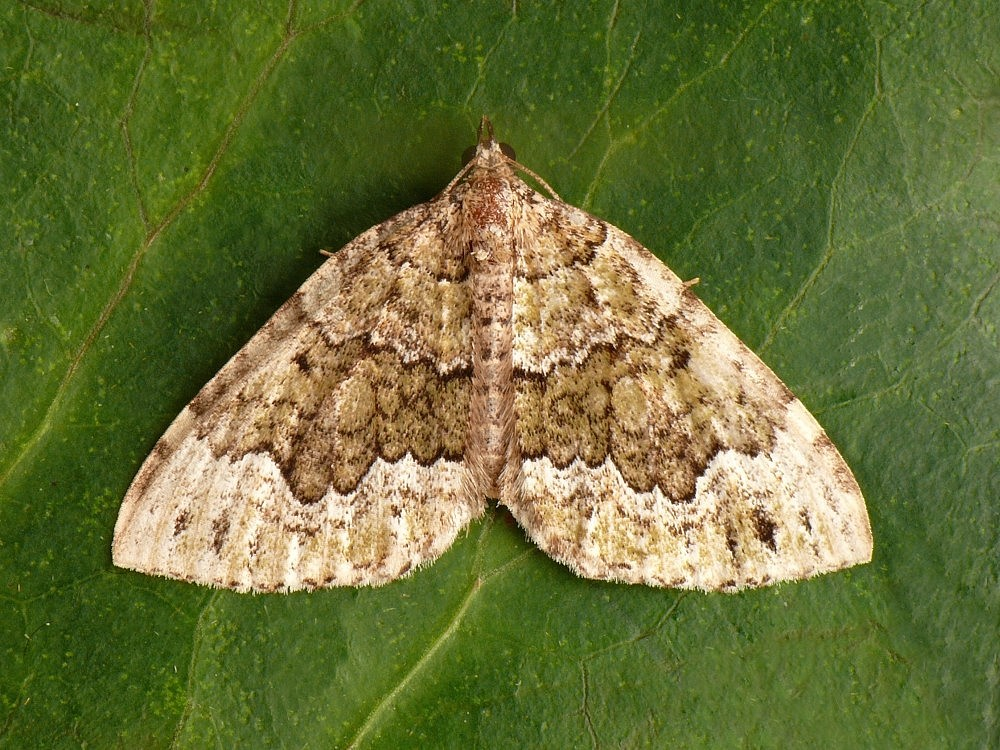

Scientific classification
- Domain: Eukaryota
- Kingdom: Animalia
- Phylum: Arthropoda
- Class: Insecta
- Order: Lepidoptera
- Family: Geometridae
- Genus: Colostygia
- Species: C. olivata

Binomial name
- Colostygia olivata (Denis & Schiffermüller, 1775)

Synonyms
- Geometra olivata Denis & Schiffermuller, 1775; Cidaria gigantea Pinker, 1953

= Colostygia olivata =

Beech-green carpet

Species of moth

Colostygia olivata, the beech-green carpet, is a moth of the family Geometridae. It was first described by Michael Denis and Ignaz Schiffermüller in 1775 and it is found in most of the Palearctic.

The wingspan is 22–27 millimetres (0.87–1.06 in). Freshly hatched moths have green forewings. There is a darker, brown central band narrower towards the centre of the forewings. This band is edged with a white wavy line. The hindwings are smoky grey with a pale crossline. The larva is stout, slightly tapering at each end, rugose, with conspicuous tubercles and setae. It is reddish-ochreous or brownish ochreous with an interrupted grey dorsal line. The lateral and ventral surfaces are mostly dull reddish; tubercles black. The pupa is rather stout, bright red or red-brown, the abdomen darker.

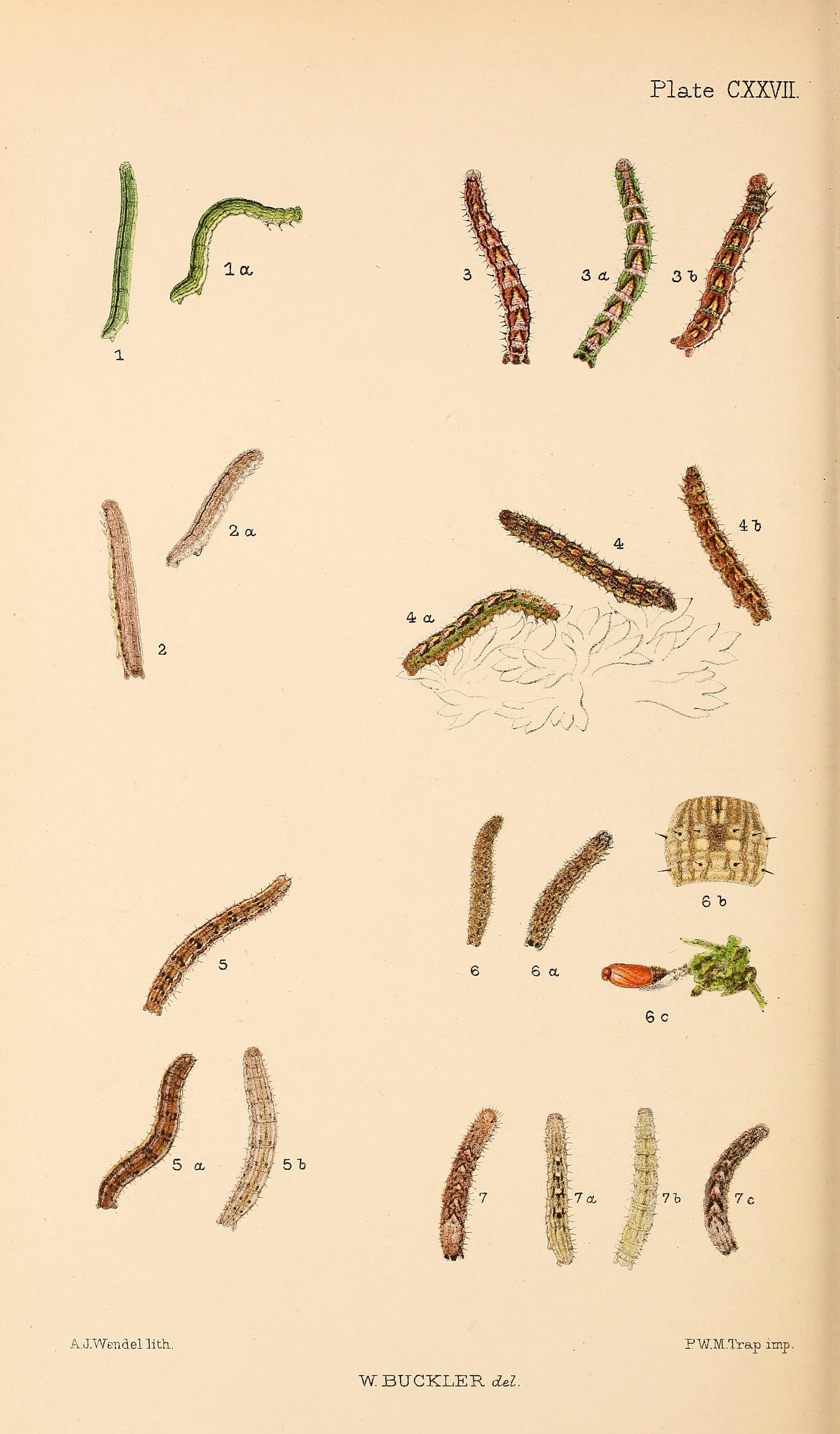
6,6a larvae after final moult 6c enlarged segment, 6d pupa

Adults are in wing from May to August in one generation.

The larvae feed on Galium species. Larvae can be found from September to May.

== Subspecies ==
- Colostygia olivata olivata
- Colostygia olivata gigantea Pinker, 1953
