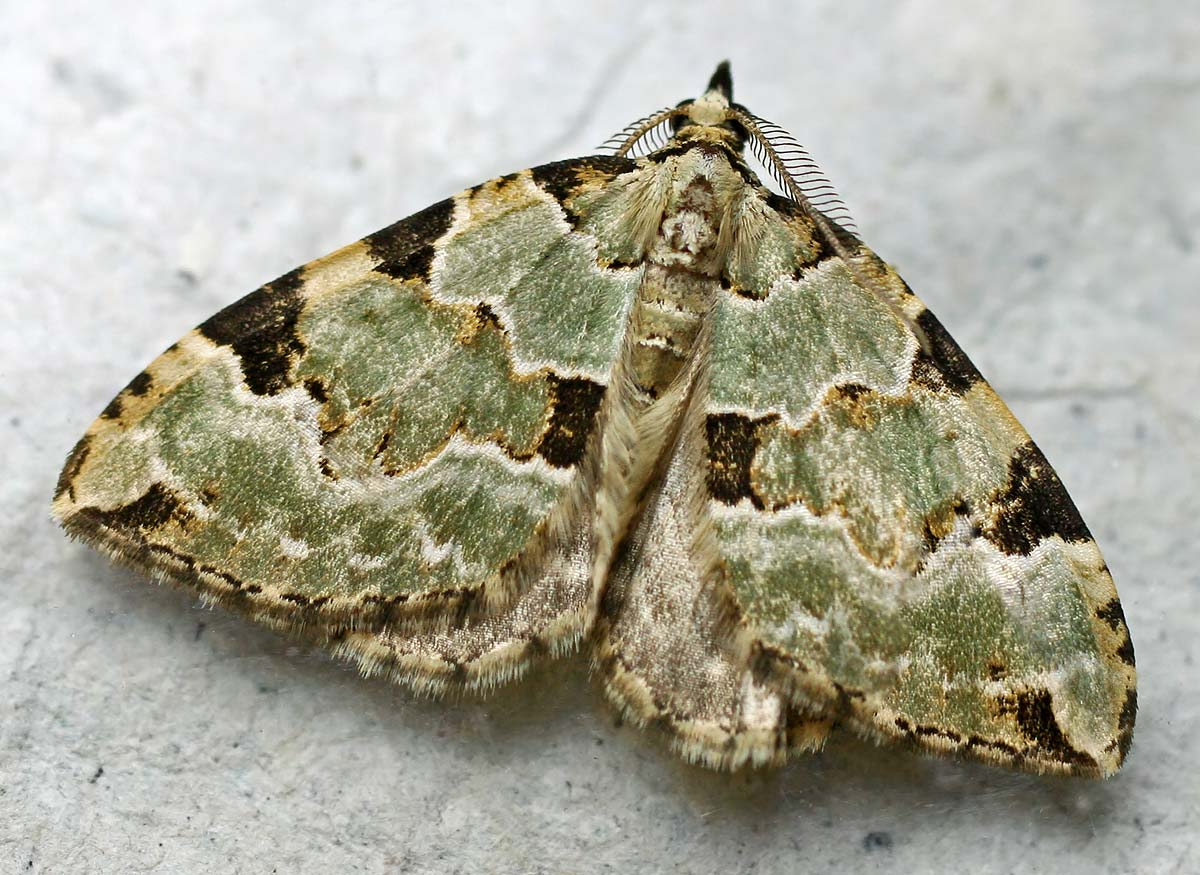
- Colostygia pectinataria

Scientific classification
- Kingdom: Animalia
- Phylum: Arthropoda
- Clade: Pancrustacea
- Class: Insecta
- Order: Lepidoptera
- Family: Geometridae
- Tribe: Cidariini
- Genus: Colostygia; Hübner, 1825

Synonyms
- Amoebe Hübner, 1825; Amoebotricha Warren, 1901; Erinobia Stephens, 1850; Euperizoma Warren, 1900

= Colostygia =

Genus of moths

Colostygia is a genus of moths in the family Geometridae erected by Jacob Hübner in 1825.

== Selected species ==
- Colostygia ablutaria (Boisduval, 1840)
- Colostygia aestivalis (Dioszeghy, 1930)
- Colostygia albidissima (Strand, 1920)
- Colostygia albigirata (Kollar, 1844) (from India)
- Colostygia albocincta (Lempke, 1950)
- Colostygia alboviridata (Haworth, 1802)
- Colostygia algidata (Möschler, 1874)
- Colostygia alpestrata (Hübner, 1800–1808)
- Colostygia approximata (Lempke, 1950)
- Colostygia aptata (Hübner, 1813)
- Colostygia aquearia (Bruand, 1846)
- Colostygia aqueata (Hübner, 1813)
- Colostygia arctica (Schryer, 1881)
- Colostygia atra (Rebel, 1910)
- Colostygia austriacaria (Herrich-Schäffer, 1852)
- Colostygia corydalaria (Graeser, 1889)
- Colostygia cyrnea (Wehrli, 1925)
- Colostygia fitzi (Schawerda, 1914)
- Colostygia hilariata (Pinker, 1954)
- Colostygia kitschelti (Rebel, 1934)
- Colostygia kollariaria (Herrich-Schäffer, 1848)
- Colostygia laetaria (La Harpe, 1853)
- Colostygia multistrigaria (Haworth, 1809) – mottled gray
- Colostygia olivata (Denis & Schiffermüller, 1775) – beech-green carpet
- Colostygia pectinataria (Knoch, 1781) – green carpet
- Colostygia pragmatica Viidalepp, 1988
- Colostygia puengeleri (Stertz, 1902)
- Colostygia sericeata (Schwingenschuss, 1926)
- Colostygia stilpna (Prout, 1924)
- Colostygia tempestaria (Herrich-Schäffer, 1852)
- Colostygia turbata (Hübner, 1799)
- Colostygia ustipennis (Hampson, 1895) (from India)
- Colostygia wolfschlaegerae (Pinker, 1953)
- Colostygia zaprjagaevi Viidalepp, 1988
