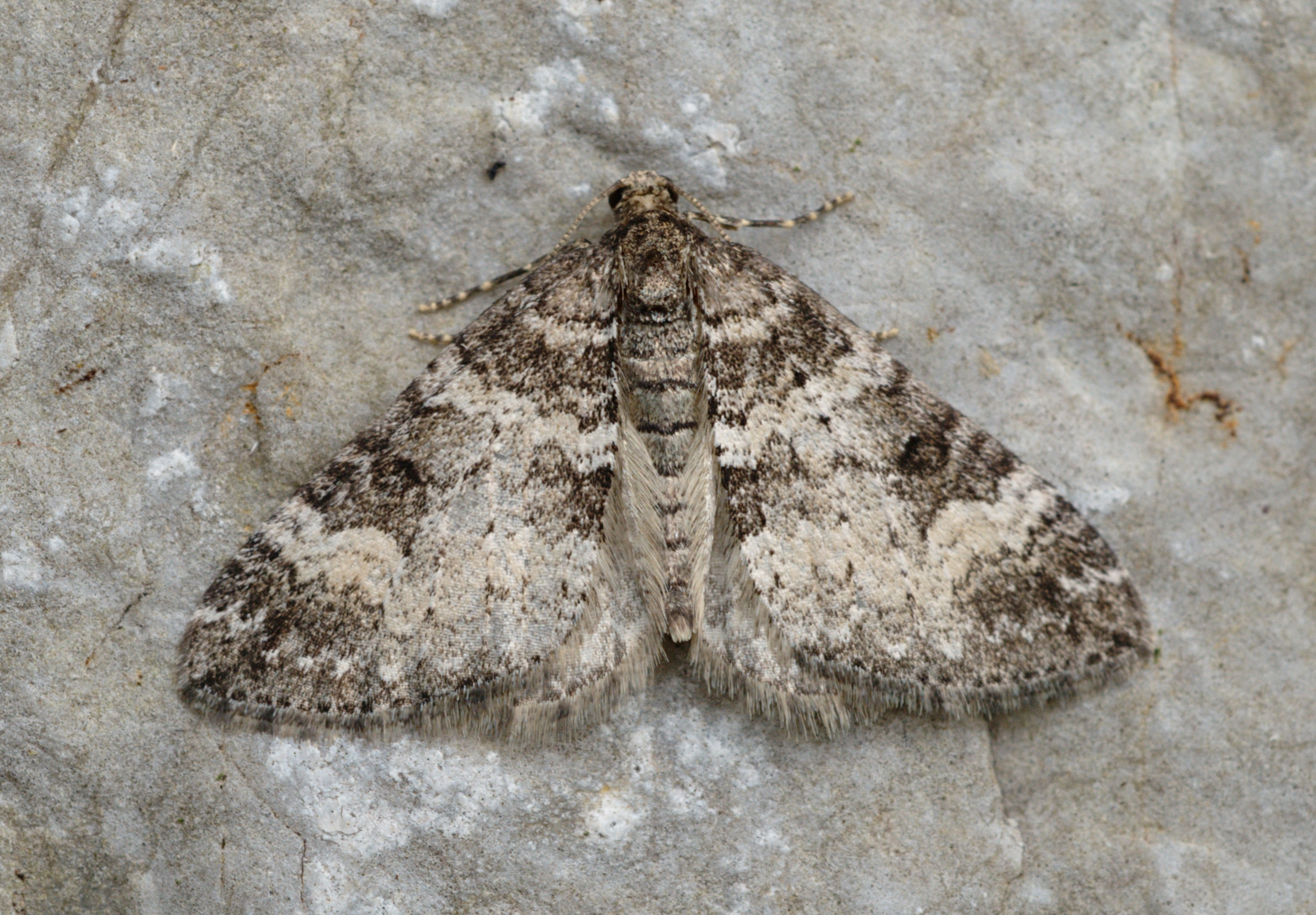

Scientific classification
- Domain: Eukaryota
- Kingdom: Animalia
- Phylum: Arthropoda
- Class: Insecta
- Order: Lepidoptera
- Family: Geometridae
- Genus: Colostygia
- Species: C. aptata

Binomial name
- Colostygia aptata (Hübner, 1813)

Synonyms
- Geometra aptata Hübner, 1813

= Colostygia aptata =

Species of moth

Colostygia aptata is a moth of the family Geometridae first described by Jacob Hübner in 1813. It is found in most of the Palearctic realm.

The wingspan is 20–25 millimetres (0.79–0.98 in). Adults are on wing from July to August.

The larvae feed on Galium species. Larvae can be found from August to June. It overwinters in the larval stage.
