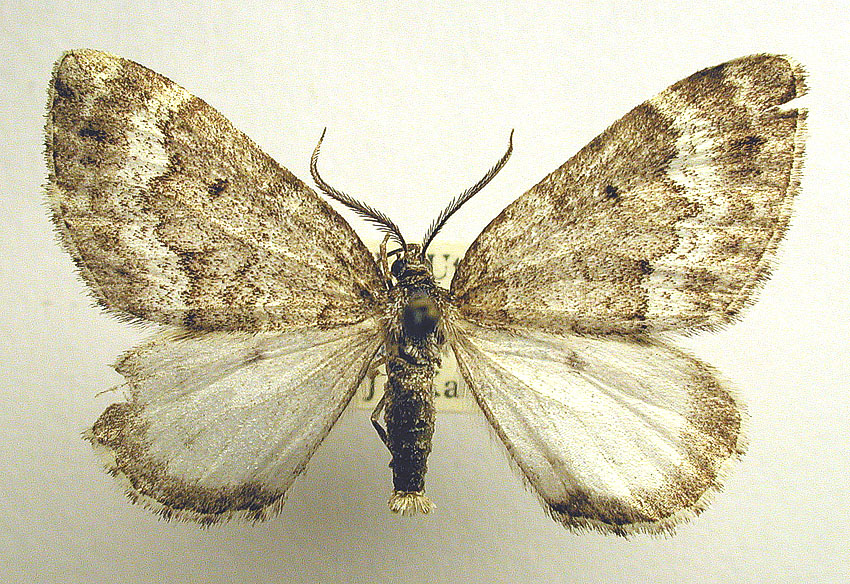

Scientific classification
- Domain: Eukaryota
- Kingdom: Animalia
- Phylum: Arthropoda
- Class: Insecta
- Order: Lepidoptera
- Family: Geometridae
- Genus: Colostygia
- Species: C. turbata

Binomial name
- Colostygia turbata (Hübner, 1799)

Synonyms
- Geometra turbata Hübner, 1813; Cidaria fuscolimbata Tengstrom, 1875; Larentia pyrenaearia Oberthur, 1882

= Colostygia turbata =

Species of moth

Colostygia turbata is a moth of the family Geometridae. It is found from the mountains of Europe to the Altai, as well as the Kamchatka Peninsula and Canada.

The wingspan is 24–27 millimetres (0.94–1.06 in). Adults are in wing from June to July.

The larvae feed on Galium palustre. Larvae can be found from June to July. It overwinters in the larval stage.

== Subspecies ==
- Colostygia turbata turbata (Alps, south-eastern Europe)
- Colostygia turbata fuscolimbata Tengstrom, 1875 (northern Europe)
- Colostygia turbata pyrenaearia Oberthur, 1882 (Pyrenees)
- Colostygia turbata altaicata (Djakonov, 1926) (Altai, Sayan Mountains, Buryatia, Kamchatka)
- Colostygia turbata circumvallaria (Taylor, 1906) (Canada)
