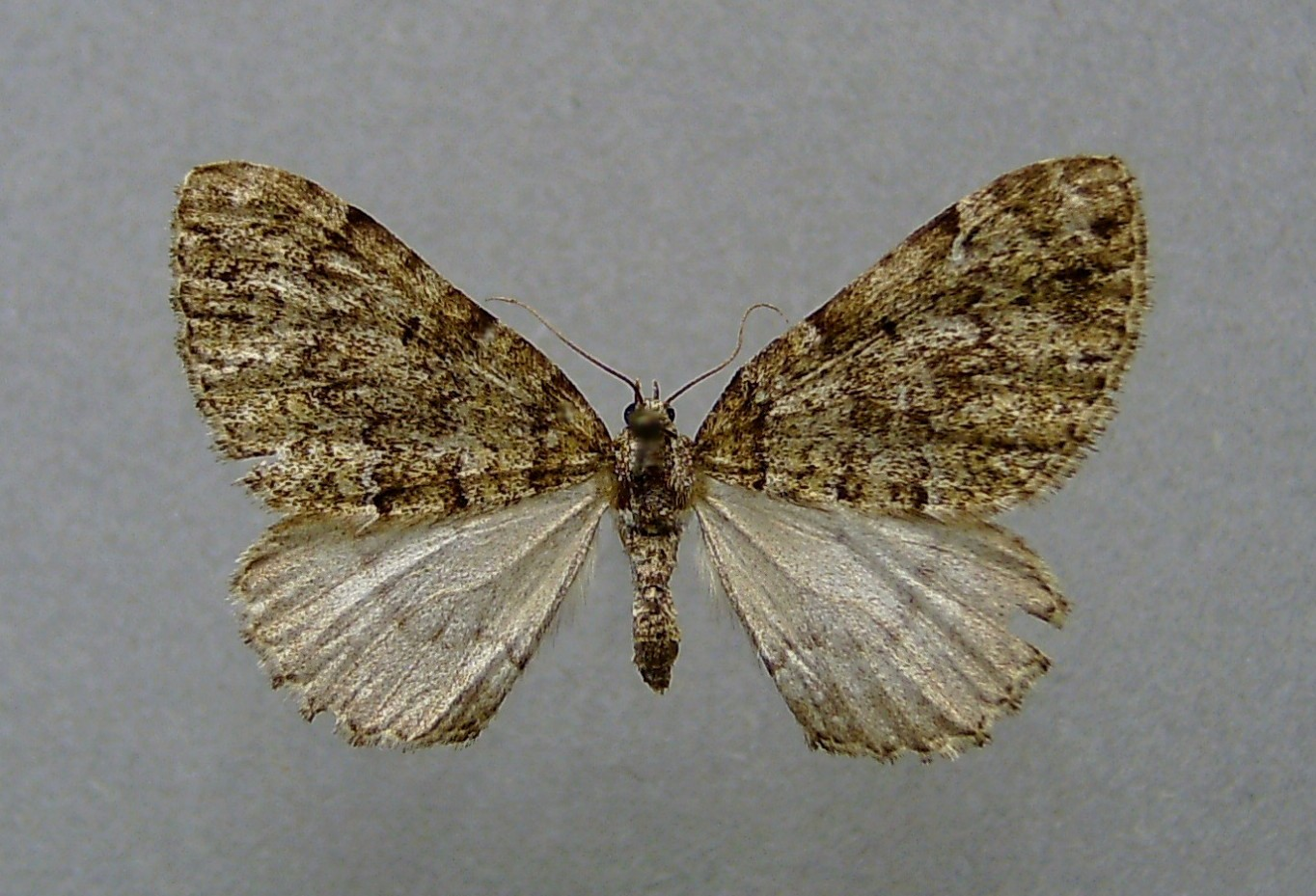

Scientific classification
- Domain: Eukaryota
- Kingdom: Animalia
- Phylum: Arthropoda
- Class: Insecta
- Order: Lepidoptera
- Family: Geometridae
- Genus: Colostygia
- Species: C. kollariaria

Binomial name
- Colostygia kollariaria (Herrich-Schäffer, 1848)

Synonyms
- Larentia kollariaria Herrich-Schäffer, 1848; Lygris feusteli Dannehl, 1927

= Colostygia kollariaria =

Species of moth

Colostygia kollariaria is a moth of the family Geometridae. It is found in the Alps and the Carpathian Mountains on altitudes between 500 and 2,000 meters.

The wingspan is 38–44 millimetres (1.5–1.7 in). Adults are in wing from May to August.

The larvae feed on the flowers of Valeriana tripteris. It overwinters in the pupal stage.
