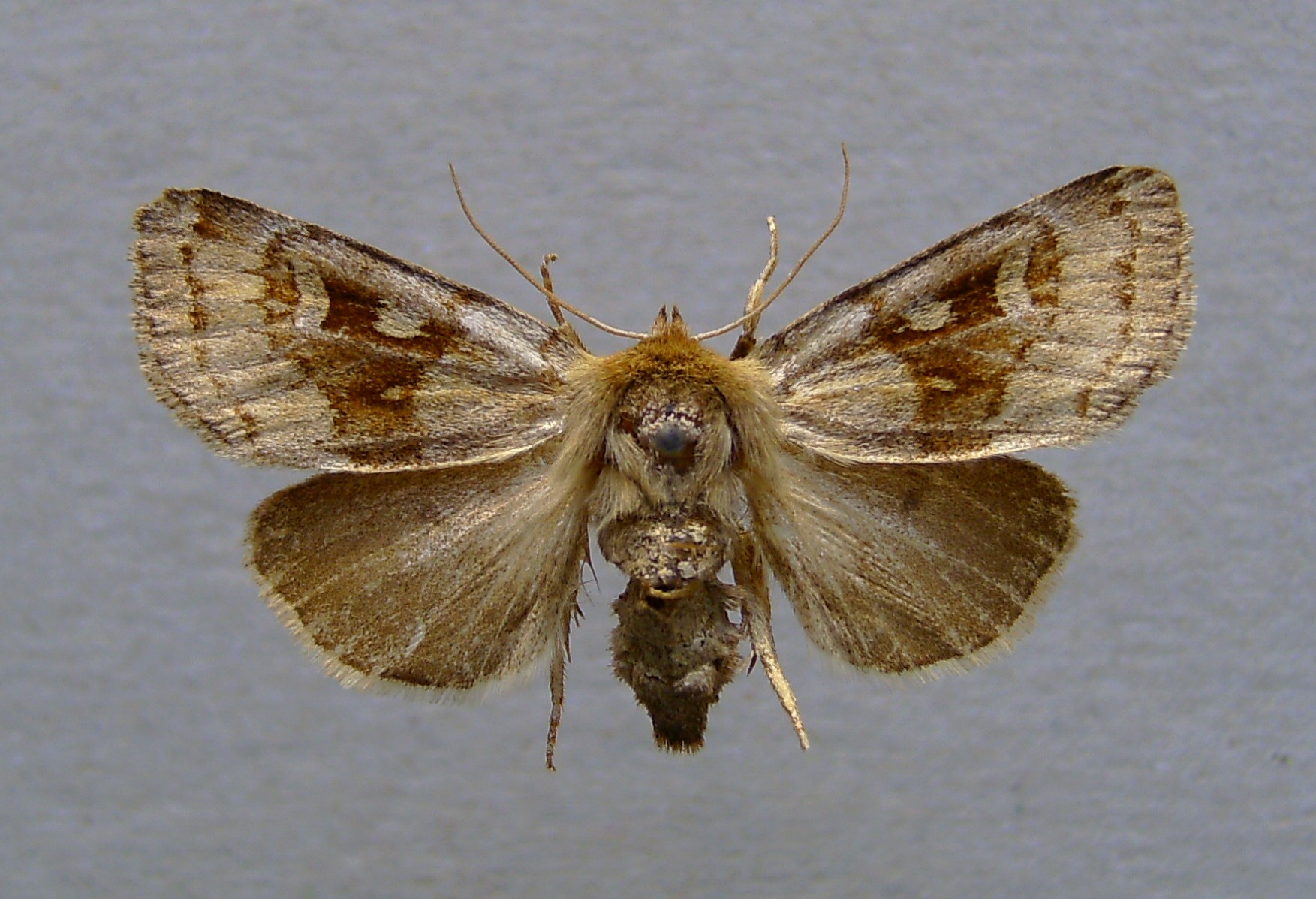

Scientific classification
- Kingdom: Animalia
- Phylum: Arthropoda
- Clade: Pancrustacea
- Class: Insecta
- Order: Lepidoptera
- Superfamily: Noctuoidea
- Family: Noctuidae
- Genus: Xestia
- Species: X. tecta

Binomial name
- Xestia tecta (Hübner, 1808)

Synonyms
- Noctua tecta Hübner, 1808; Noctua ampla Hübner, 1809; Anomogyna nolens Corti & Draudt, 1933; Pachnobia roosta Smith, 1903; Pachnobia tecta ab. gaunitzi Nordström, 1937; Agrotis tectoides Corti, 1926

= Xestia tecta =

Species of moth

Xestia tecta is a species of moth in the family Noctuidae. In Europe, the species is only known from the boreal area of Fennoscandia, north-western Russia and the northern Ural Mountains. Outside of Europe it occurs in northern and central Siberia and the north-western USA including Alaska as well as north-western and central Canada.

The wingspan is 32–41 mm. Adults are on wing from July to August. Males are nocturnal, and females are active in the afternoon. The larvae are reddish brown, and have a white lateral band. The species takes two years to reach maturity.

The larvae feed on dwarf birch (Betula nana), and hardwood shrubs such as huckleberries in the genus Vaccinium.

== Subspecies ==
- Xestia tecta tecta
- Xestia tecta tectoides (Corti, 1926) (Labrador)
