= Coleophora peri =

Scientific classification
- Kingdom: Animalia
- Phylum: Arthropoda
- Class: Insecta
- Order: Lepidoptera
- Family: Coleophoridae
- Genus: Coleophora
- Species: C. peri

Binomial name
- Coleophora peri Svensson, 1976

Species of moth

Coleophora peri is a moth of the family Coleophoridae. It is found in Sweden.

The wingspan is 12–14 mm. Adults are on wing from the end of June to July.

The larvae feed on Potentilla fruticosa. They first create a hairy, spatulate leaf case of about 7 mm. The mouth angle is about 30°. In spring, they bore into a developing bud, perforating the base of the scales, and eat them out. Later, they start mining again. Larvae can be found from autumn to June.
