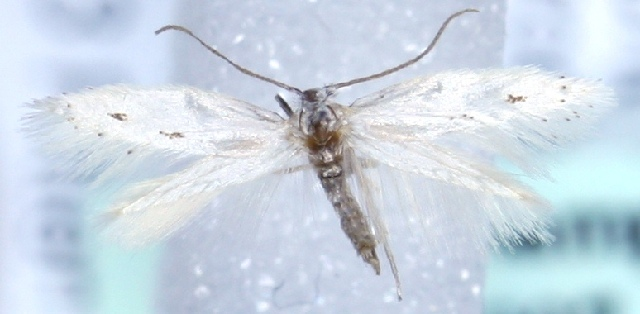

Scientific classification
- Kingdom: Animalia
- Phylum: Arthropoda
- Class: Insecta
- Order: Lepidoptera
- Family: Elachistidae
- Genus: Elachista
- Species: E. elsaella

Binomial name
- Elachista elsaella Traugott-Olsen, 1988

= Elachista elsaella =

Species of moth

Elachista elsaella is a moth of the family Elachistidae that is endemic to Sweden.

The wingspan is 7–9 millimetres (0.28–0.35 in). Adults are on wing from May to August.
