= Xestia elimata =

Scientific classification
- Kingdom: Animalia
- Phylum: Arthropoda
- Class: Insecta
- Order: Lepidoptera
- Superfamily: Noctuoidea
- Family: Noctuidae
- Genus: Xestia
- Species: X. elimata

Binomial name
- Xestia elimata Guenée, 1852

Synonyms
- Anomogyna elimata

Species of moth

Xestia elimata, the southern variable dart or variable climbing caterpillar, is a moth of the family Noctuidae. The species was first described by Achille Guenée in 1852. It is found in the eastern part of North America, including Georgia, Tennessee, North Carolina, New Jersey, Maryland and New England.

It is part of the elimata species group. Three species in this group (Xestia praevia, Xestia elimata and Xestia badicollis) have no significant difference in their genitals nor DNA, suggesting they may be a single species.

This wingspan is about 42 mm. The moth flies from September to October depending on the location. There is one generation per year.

The larva feeds on Pinus species, including pitch, red and other hard pines.
