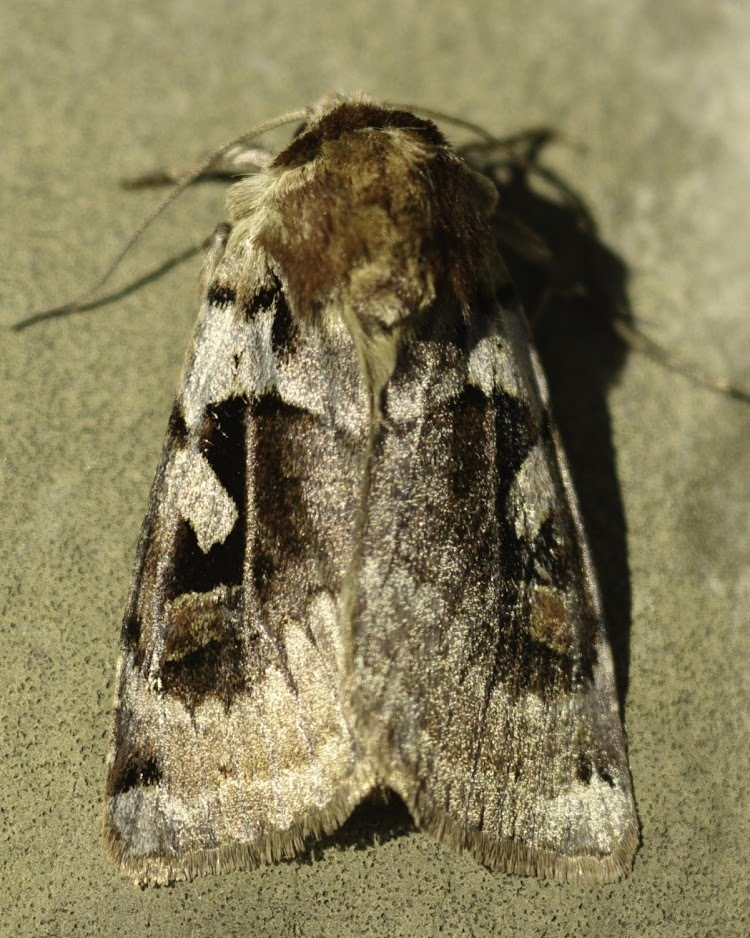

Scientific classification
- Kingdom: Animalia
- Phylum: Arthropoda
- Class: Insecta
- Order: Lepidoptera
- Superfamily: Noctuoidea
- Family: Noctuidae
- Genus: Xestia
- Species: X. wockei

Binomial name
- Xestia wockei (Möschler, 1862)

Synonyms
- Agrotis wockei Möschler, 1862; Pachnobia wockei; Agrotis voccei Hampson, 1903; Agrotis aldani Herz, 1903

= Xestia wockei =

Species of moth

Xestia wockei is a moth of the family Noctuidae. It is known from Siberia and northern North America, including Quebec, Newfoundland and Labrador, the Northwest Territories and Yukon.

== Subspecies ==
- Xestia wockei wockei
- Xestia wockei troubridgei Lafontaine, 1998
- Xestia wockei aldani (Herz, 1903)
- Xestia wockei tundrana (A.Bang-Haas, 1912) (South Siberian Mountains, Central Yakutian Lowland and the mountains of north-eastern Siberia)

Xestia scropulana was generally included in X. wockei, but more recent authors usually treat it as distinct species.
