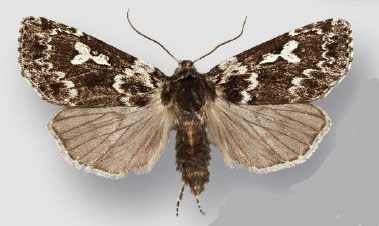
- Male Xestia perquiritata orca
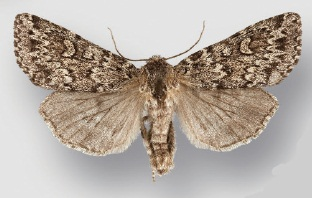
- Male Xestia perquiritata orca

Scientific classification
- Domain: Eukaryota
- Kingdom: Animalia
- Phylum: Arthropoda
- Class: Insecta
- Order: Lepidoptera
- Superfamily: Noctuoidea
- Family: Noctuidae
- Genus: Xestia
- Species: X. perquiritata

Binomial name
- Xestia perquiritata (Morrison, 1874)

Synonyms
- Polia perquiritata Morrison, 1875; Anomogyna perquiritata; Agrotis baileyana Grote, 1880; Aplectoides beddeci Hampson, 1913; Anomogyna partita McDunnough, 1921; Anomogyna clarkei Benjamin, 1933

= Xestia perquiritata =

Species of moth

Xestia perquiritata, the boomerang dart, is a moth of the family Noctuidae. The species was first described by Herbert Knowles Morrison in 1874. It is found across North America from Newfoundland, Labrador and northern New England, west to central Yukon, British Columbia and Washington. There are several disjunct populations, including one in the Great Smoky Mountains National Park and the Rocky Mountains in Colorado and a coastal bog in central Oregon.

The wingspan is 38–45 mm. Adults are on wing from June to August. There is one generation per year.

The larvae feed on various spruce-fir species. They have been reared on Picea glauca, Picea engelmannii, Abies balsamea and Abies lasiocarpa.

== Subspecies ==
- Xestia perquiritata perquiritata
- Xestia perquiritata beddeki (Hampson, 1913)
- Xestia perquiritata clarkei (Benjamin, 1933)
- Xestia perquiritata orca Crabo & Hammond, 2013 (Pacific Coast of Oregon and Washington)
- Xestia perquiritata partita (McDunnough, 1921)
