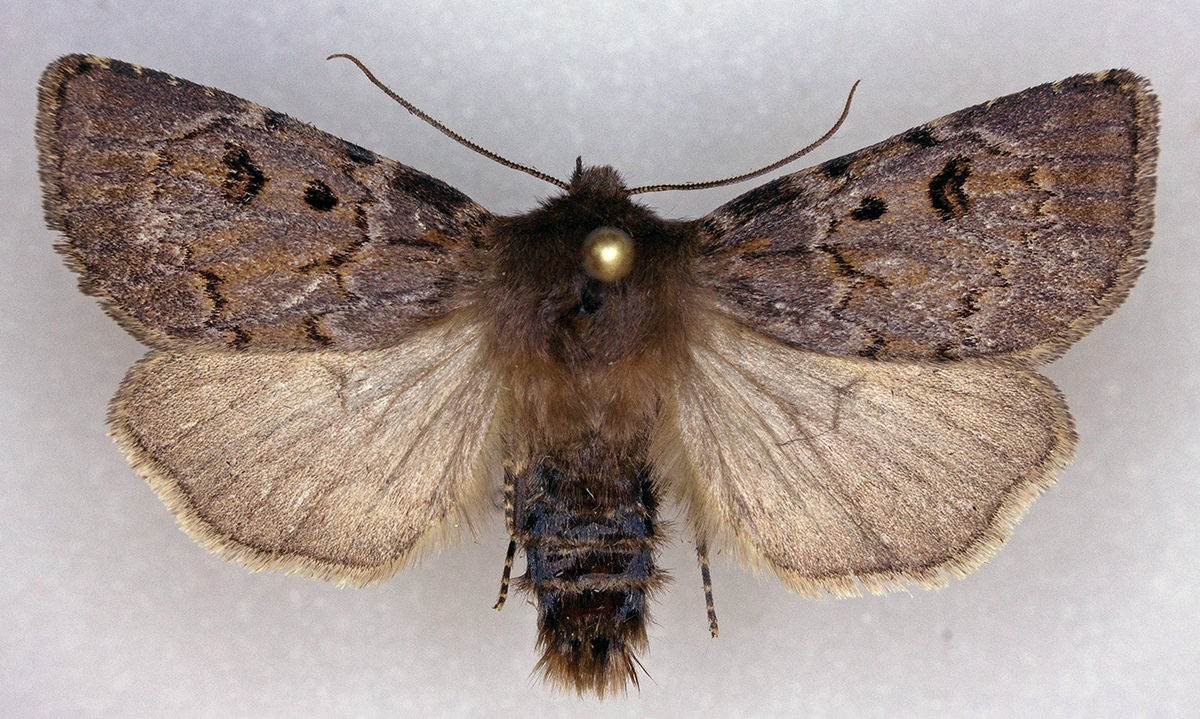

Scientific classification
- Domain: Eukaryota
- Kingdom: Animalia
- Phylum: Arthropoda
- Class: Insecta
- Order: Lepidoptera
- Superfamily: Noctuoidea
- Family: Noctuidae
- Genus: Xestia
- Species: X. ursae

Binomial name
- Xestia ursae (McDunnough, 1940)

= Xestia ursae =

Species of moth

Xestia ursae is a species of cutworm or dart moth in the family Noctuidae.
