= X. maculata =

X. maculata may refer to:

- Xenoplia maculata, a geometer moth
- Xestia maculata, an owlet moth
- Xylomyia maculata, a wood soldier fly
