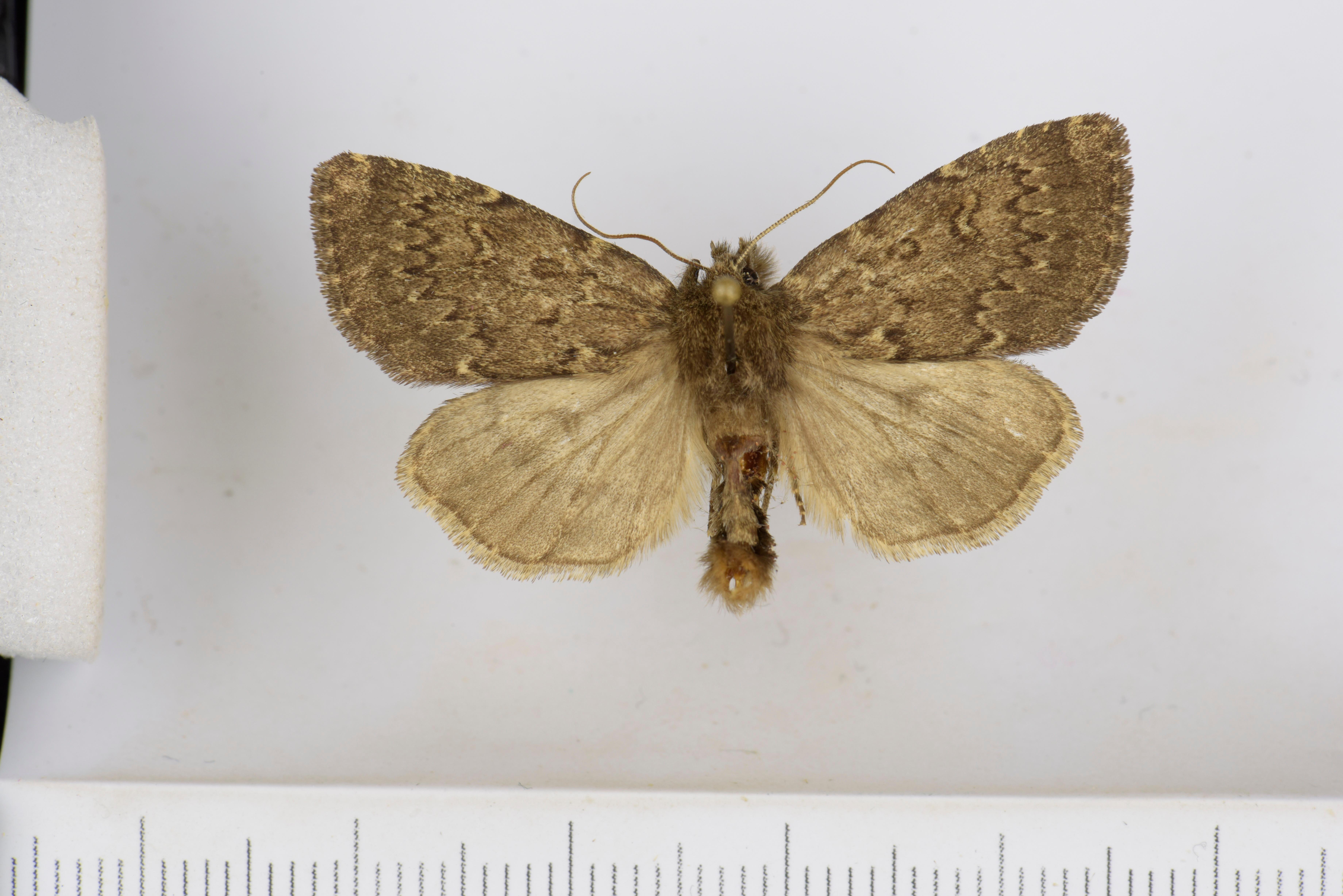
- Xestia atrata filipjevi

Scientific classification
- Domain: Eukaryota
- Kingdom: Animalia
- Phylum: Arthropoda
- Class: Insecta
- Order: Lepidoptera
- Superfamily: Noctuoidea
- Family: Noctuidae
- Genus: Xestia
- Species: X. atrata

Binomial name
- Xestia atrata (Morrison, 1874)

= Xestia atrata =

Species of moth

Xestia atrata is a species of moth belonging to the family Noctuidae.

It is native to the Northern Hemisphere.
