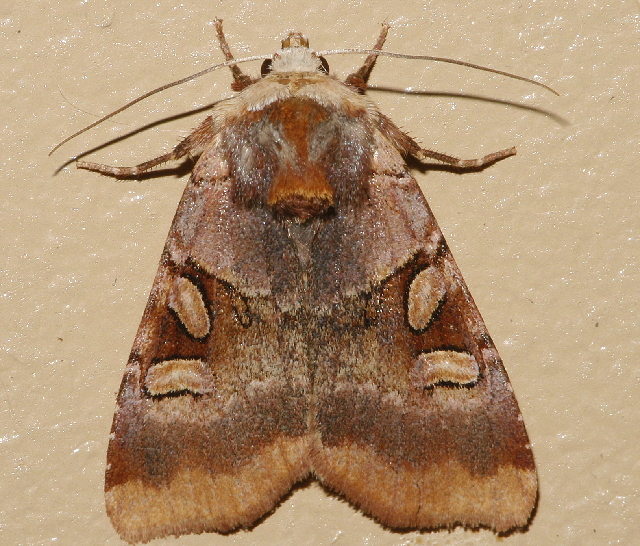

Scientific classification
- Kingdom: Animalia
- Phylum: Arthropoda
- Class: Insecta
- Order: Lepidoptera
- Superfamily: Noctuoidea
- Family: Noctuidae
- Tribe: Noctuini
- Subtribe: Noctuina
- Genus: Xestia
- Species: X. oblata

Binomial name
- Xestia oblata (Morrison, 1875)

= Xestia oblata =

Species of moth

Xestia oblata, known generally as the rosy dart or ruby dart, is a species of cutworm or dart moth in the family Noctuidae. It is found in North America.

The MONA or Hodges number for Xestia oblata is 10947.

== Subspecies ==
These two subspecies belong to the species Xestia oblata:

- Xestia oblata oblata
- Xestia oblata streckeri Barnes & Benjamin, 1927
