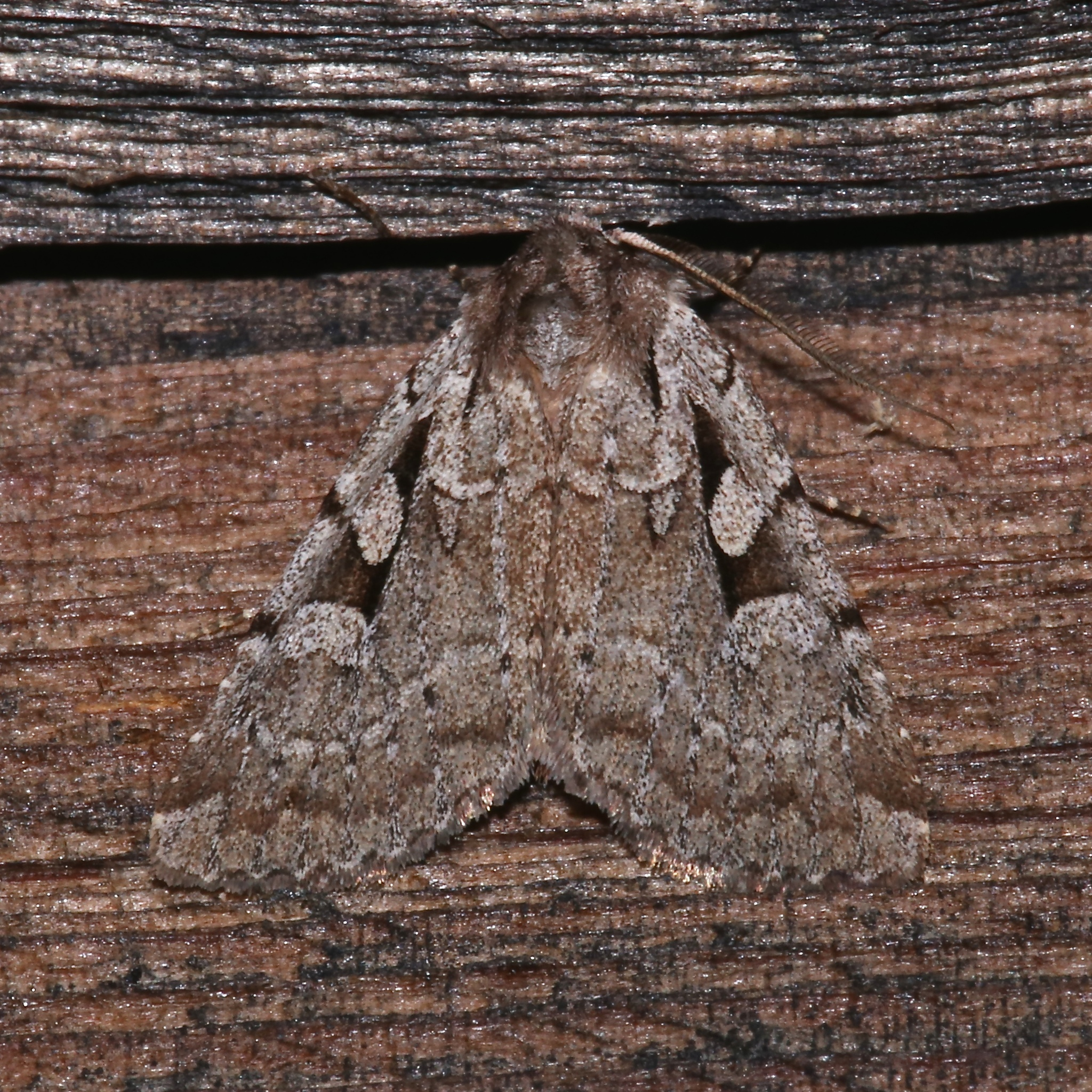

Scientific classification
- Domain: Eukaryota
- Kingdom: Animalia
- Phylum: Arthropoda
- Class: Insecta
- Order: Lepidoptera
- Superfamily: Noctuoidea
- Family: Noctuidae
- Genus: Xestia
- Species: X. badicollis

Binomial name
- Xestia badicollis Grote, 1873

Synonyms
- Anomogyna badicollis

= Xestia badicollis =

Species of insect

Xestia badicollis, the northern variable dart, northern conifer dart or white pine cutworm when referring to the larval stage, is a moth of the family Noctuidae. The species was first described by Augustus Radcliffe Grote in 1873. It is found in North America from Nova Scotia to North Carolina, west to Missouri and Ontario.

It is part of the elimata species group. Three of the species in this group (Xestia praevia, Xestia elimata and Xestia badicollis) have no significant difference in genitals nor DNA, suggesting they may be a single species.

This wingspan is 32–45 mm. The moth flies from July to October depending on the location. There is one generation per year.

The larva feeds on eastern white pine and less frequently on balsam fir, eastern hemlock, eastern larch, white spruce and other conifers.
