= Spotted cutworm =

Spotted cutworm refers to the caterpillar larvae of certain Noctuinae moth, in particular:

- Xestia c-nigrum, of the Palaearctic Setaceous Hebrew Character moth
- Xestia dolosa, also known as Woodland Spotted Cutworm, of the North American Greater Black-letter Dart moth
