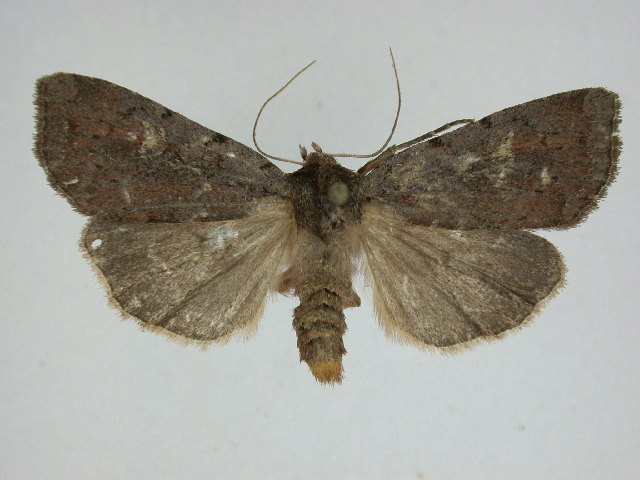

Scientific classification
- Domain: Eukaryota
- Kingdom: Animalia
- Phylum: Arthropoda
- Class: Insecta
- Order: Lepidoptera
- Superfamily: Noctuoidea
- Family: Noctuidae
- Genus: Xestia
- Species: X. dilucida

Binomial name
- Xestia dilucida Morrison, 1875

Synonyms
- Anomogyna dilucida (Morrison, 1875); Xestia janualis Grote, 1878; Xestia youngii Smith, 1902

= Xestia dilucida =

Species of moth

Xestia dilucida, the dull reddish dart or reddish heath dart, is a moth of the family Noctuidae. The species was first described by Herbert Knowles Morrison in 1875. It is found in the United States from southern Maine to northern Florida, west to central Ohio and eastern Texas.

The wingspan is about 36 mm. Adults are on wing from September to November. There is one generation per year.

The larvae have been recorded on Vaccinium species.
