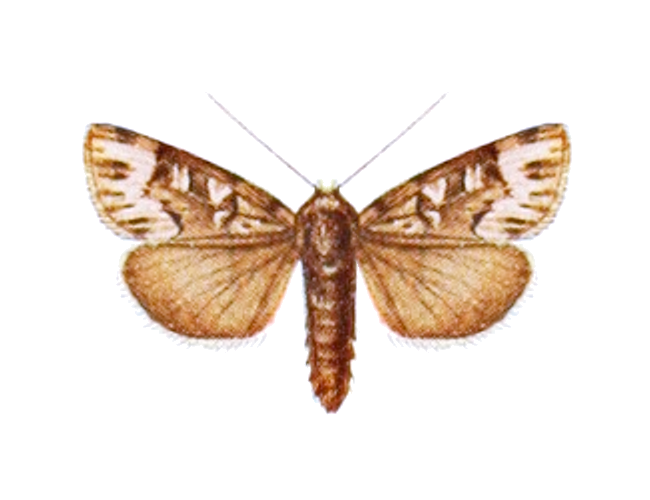

Scientific classification
- Kingdom: Animalia
- Phylum: Arthropoda
- Class: Insecta
- Order: Lepidoptera
- Superfamily: Noctuoidea
- Family: Noctuidae
- Genus: Xestia
- Species: X. staudingeri

Binomial name
- Xestia staudingeri (Möschler, 1862)

Synonyms
- Agrotis staudingeri Möschler, 1862; Agrotiphila staudingeri (Möschler, 1862)

= Xestia staudingeri =

Species of moth

Xestia staudingeri is a moth of the family Noctuidae. It is known from Siberia (West Siberian Lowland, Middle Siberia, and the mountains of north-east Siberia), as well as North America (including Quebec and Newfoundland and Labrador).
