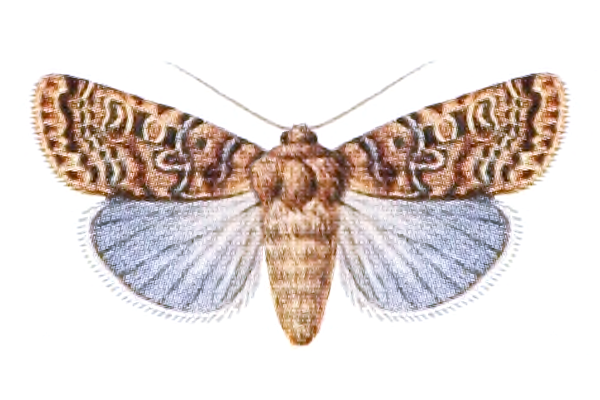

Scientific classification
- Domain: Eukaryota
- Kingdom: Animalia
- Phylum: Arthropoda
- Class: Insecta
- Order: Lepidoptera
- Superfamily: Noctuoidea
- Family: Noctuidae
- Genus: Xestia
- Species: X. bolteri

Binomial name
- Xestia bolteri (Smith, 1898)

Synonyms
- Noctua bolteri Smith, 1898

= Xestia bolteri =

Species of moth

Xestia bolteri is a moth of the family Noctuidae. It is known from North America, including Arizona, New Mexico, Utah and Colorado.

The wingspan is about 35 mm.
