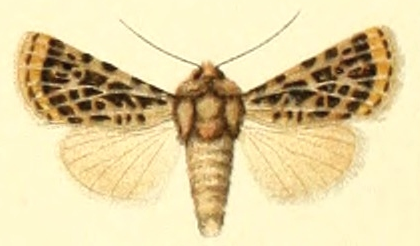

Scientific classification
- Kingdom: Animalia
- Phylum: Arthropoda
- Class: Insecta
- Order: Lepidoptera
- Superfamily: Noctuoidea
- Family: Noctuidae
- Genus: Xestia
- Species: X. trifida

Binomial name
- Xestia trifida (Fischer von Waldheim, 1820)

Synonyms
- Euxoa trifida; Noctua trifida Fischer von Waldheim, 1820; Agrotis rogneda Staudinger, 1870; Phleboeis atra Bang-Haas, 1912

= Xestia trifida =

Species of moth

Xestia trifida is a moth of the family Noctuidae. It is found in Romania, Ukraine, southern Russia, Turkey and Turkmenistan as well as the Iberian Peninsula.

== Subspecies ==
- Xestia trifida hispanica Fibiger, 1993 (Portugal, Spain)
- Xestia trifida trifida (Fischer von Waldheim, 1820)
