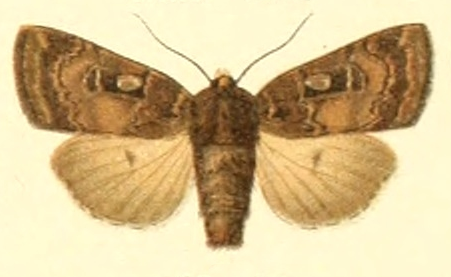

Scientific classification
- Domain: Eukaryota
- Kingdom: Animalia
- Phylum: Arthropoda
- Class: Insecta
- Order: Lepidoptera
- Superfamily: Noctuoidea
- Family: Noctuidae
- Genus: Xestia
- Species: X. collina

Binomial name
- Xestia collina (Boisduval, 1840)

Synonyms
- Noctua collina Boisduval, 1840; Agrotis collina (Boisduval, 1840); Euxoa collina (Boisduval, 1840); Noctua montana Freyer, 1850; Agrotis eversmanni Petersen, 1905; Agrotis peterseni Krulikovsky, 1909; Xestia nigromaculata Hoffmann, 1917; Xestia collina ab. nigromarginata Lange, 1917; Xestia roeggeri Schawerda, 1919; Xestia loebeli Rebeli, 1920

= Xestia collina =

Species of moth

Xestia collina is a moth of the family Noctuidae. It is found in the Alps, from southern France to southern Poland, Romania, from southern Finland and Estonia to the Urals, Siberia and northern Mongolia.

The wingspan is 27–33 mm. Adults are on wing from the end of June to mid July.

The larvae feed on Vaccinium, Rubus, Plantago and Achillea species.
