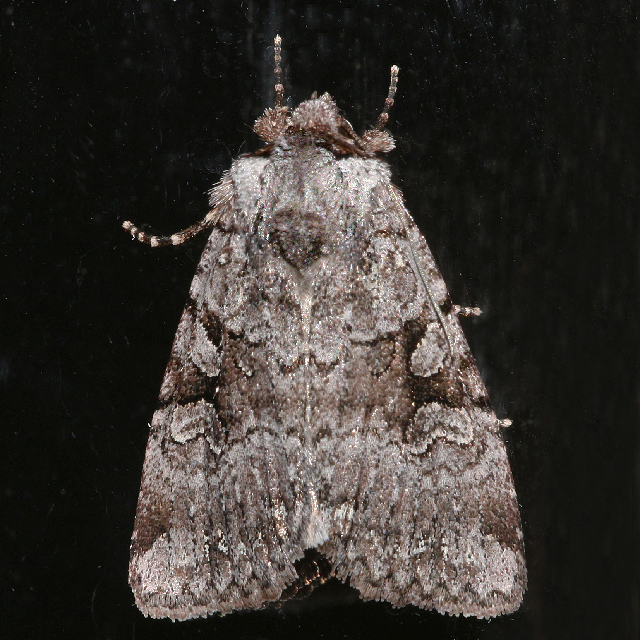

Scientific classification
- Domain: Eukaryota
- Kingdom: Animalia
- Phylum: Arthropoda
- Class: Insecta
- Order: Lepidoptera
- Superfamily: Noctuoidea
- Family: Noctuidae
- Tribe: Noctuini
- Subtribe: Noctuina
- Genus: Xestia
- Species: X. mustelina

Binomial name
- Xestia mustelina (Smith, 1900)

= Xestia mustelina =

Species of moth

Xestia mustelina is a species of cutworm or dart moth in the family Noctuidae. It is found in North America.

The MONA or Hodges number for Xestia mustelina is 10971.
