= Xestia inuitica =

Scientific classification
- Domain: Eukaryota
- Kingdom: Animalia
- Phylum: Arthropoda
- Class: Insecta
- Order: Lepidoptera
- Superfamily: Noctuoidea
- Family: Noctuidae
- Tribe: Noctuini
- Subtribe: Noctuina
- Genus: Xestia
- Species: X. inuitica

Binomial name
- Xestia inuitica Lafontaine & Hensel, 1998

Species of moth

Xestia inuitica is a species of cutworm or dart moth in the family Noctuidae. It is found in North America.

The MONA or Hodges number for Xestia inuitica is 10980.1.
