= Xestia imperita =

Scientific classification
- Kingdom: Animalia
- Phylum: Arthropoda
- Class: Insecta
- Order: Lepidoptera
- Superfamily: Noctuoidea
- Family: Noctuidae
- Tribe: Noctuini
- Subtribe: Noctuina
- Genus: Xestia
- Species: X. imperita

Binomial name
- Xestia imperita (Hubner, 1831)

Species of moth

Xestia imperita is a species of cutworm or dart moth in the family Noctuidae.

The MONA or Hodges number for Xestia imperita is 10965.
