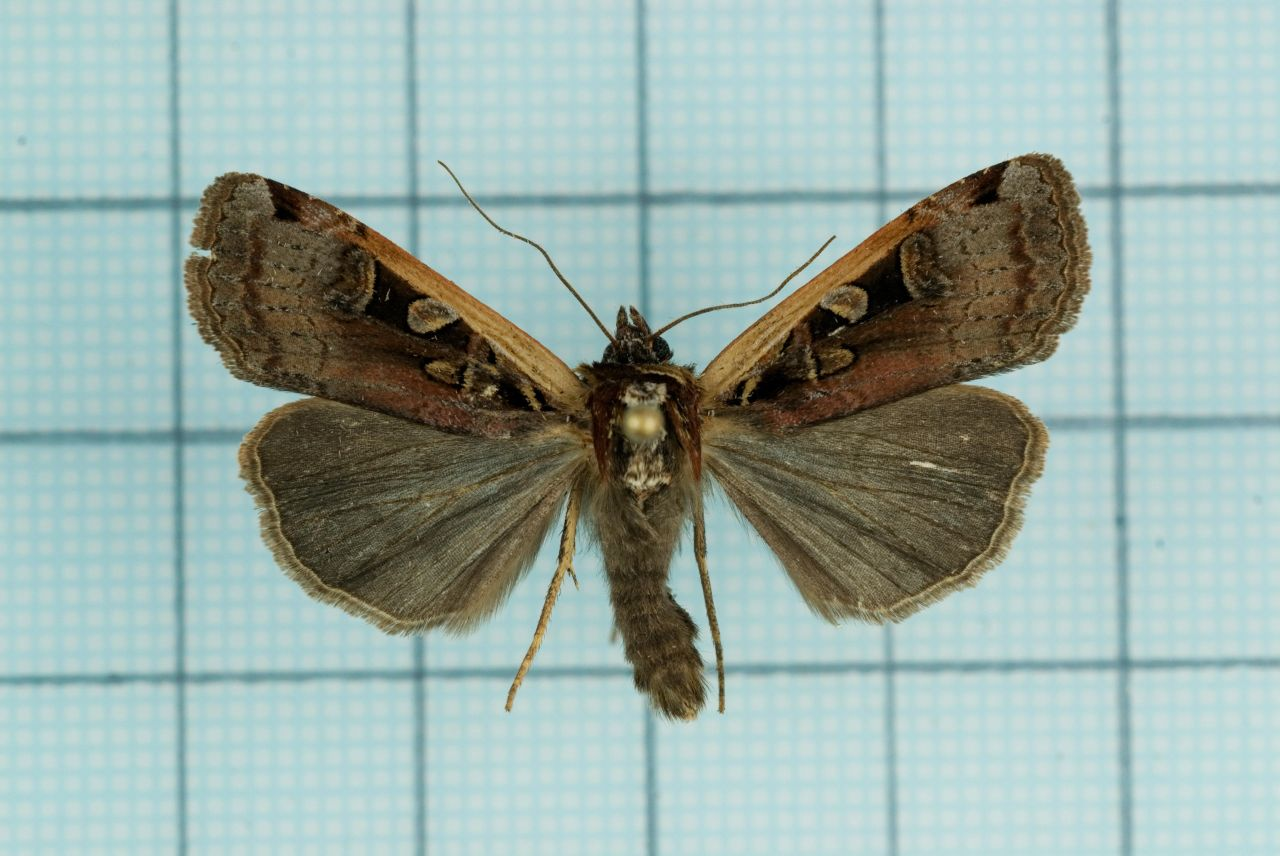

Scientific classification
- Kingdom: Animalia
- Phylum: Arthropoda
- Class: Insecta
- Order: Lepidoptera
- Superfamily: Noctuoidea
- Family: Noctuidae
- Genus: Xestia
- Species: X. tamsi

Binomial name
- Xestia tamsi (Wileman & West, 1929)

Synonyms
- Agrotis tamsi Wileman & West, 1929

= Xestia tamsi =

Species of moth

Xestia tamsi is a species of moth of the family Noctuidae. It is found in Taiwan.

The wingspan is 35–45 mm.
