= Xestia hypographa =

Scientific classification
- Domain: Eukaryota
- Kingdom: Animalia
- Phylum: Arthropoda
- Class: Insecta
- Order: Lepidoptera
- Superfamily: Noctuoidea
- Family: Noctuidae
- Genus: Xestia
- Species: X. hypographa

Binomial name
- Xestia hypographa Varga & Ronkay, 2002

Species of moth

Xestia hypographa is a moth of the family Noctuidae. It is only known from the north-western part of the Tien-Shan Mountains.

The wingspan is 32–34 mm.
