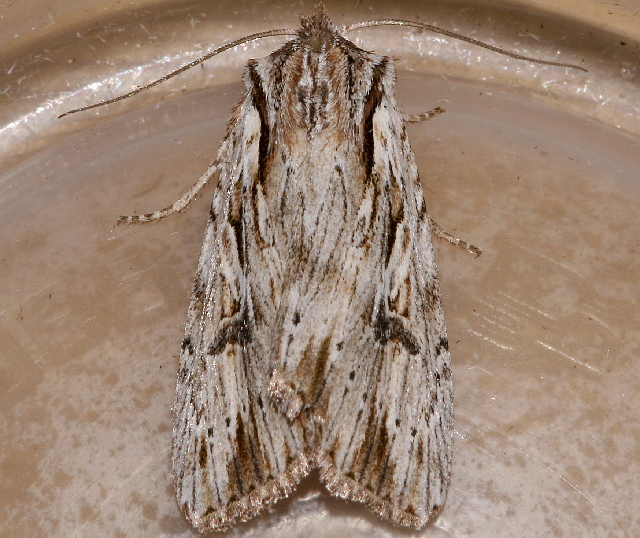

Scientific classification
- Kingdom: Animalia
- Phylum: Arthropoda
- Clade: Pancrustacea
- Class: Insecta
- Order: Lepidoptera
- Superfamily: Noctuoidea
- Family: Noctuidae
- Genus: Xestia
- Species: X. infimatis

Binomial name
- Xestia infimatis (Grote, 1880)

= Xestia infimatis =

Species of moth

Xestia infimatis is a species of cutworm or dart moth in the family Noctuidae. It was described by Augustus Radcliffe Grote in 1880 and is found in North America.

The MONA or Hodges number for Xestia infimatis is 10972.
