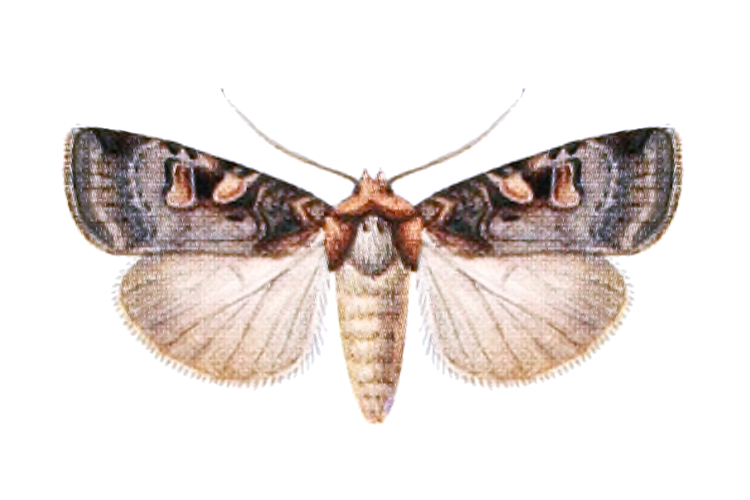

Scientific classification
- Kingdom: Animalia
- Phylum: Arthropoda
- Clade: Pancrustacea
- Class: Insecta
- Order: Lepidoptera
- Superfamily: Noctuoidea
- Family: Noctuidae
- Genus: Xestia
- Species: X. conchis

Binomial name
- Xestia conchis (Grotte, 1879)

Synonyms
- Agrotis conchis Grote, 1879

= Xestia conchis =

Species of moth

Xestia conchis is a moth of the family Noctuidae. It is known from North America, including Arizona, Utah and Colorado.

The wingspan is about 35 mm.
