= Xestia colorado =

Scientific classification
- Domain: Eukaryota
- Kingdom: Animalia
- Phylum: Arthropoda
- Class: Insecta
- Order: Lepidoptera
- Superfamily: Noctuoidea
- Family: Noctuidae
- Tribe: Noctuini
- Subtribe: Noctuina
- Genus: Xestia
- Species: X. colorado

Binomial name
- Xestia colorado (Smith, 1891)

Species of moth

Xestia colorado is a species of cutworm or dart moth in the family Noctuidae.

The MONA or Hodges number for Xestia colorado is 10982.
