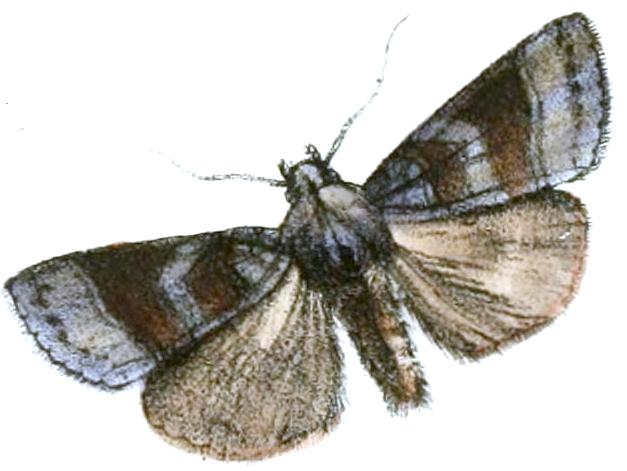

Scientific classification
- Domain: Eukaryota
- Kingdom: Animalia
- Phylum: Arthropoda
- Class: Insecta
- Order: Lepidoptera
- Superfamily: Noctuoidea
- Family: Noctuidae
- Genus: Xestia
- Species: X. cervina

Binomial name
- Xestia cervina (Moore, 1867)

Synonyms
- Mythimna cervina Moore, 1867

= Xestia cervina =

Species of moth

Xestia cervina is a species of moth of the family Noctuidae. It is found in India.
