= Xestia normaniana =

Scientific classification
- Kingdom: Animalia
- Phylum: Arthropoda
- Class: Insecta
- Order: Lepidoptera
- Superfamily: Noctuoidea
- Family: Noctuidae
- Genus: Xestia
- Species: X. normaniana

Binomial name
- Xestia normaniana (Grote, 1874)

Synonyms
- Xestia normanianus (lapsus); Xestia obtusa (Speyer, 1875); Xestia triangulum var. A (Guenée, 1852)

Species of moth

Xestia normaniana, or Norman's dart, is a moth of the family Noctuidae. The species was first described by Augustus Radcliffe Grote in 1874. It is found in North America from Nova Scotia across southern and central Canada to Alberta. In the eastern United States it ranges from Maine to eastern Minnesota, and south along the Appalachians to western North Carolina. It has recently been recorded from Tennessee.

The wingspan is 35–41 mm. Adults are on wing from July to October. There is one generation per year.

The larvae mainly feed on shrubs, including Vaccinium, Prunus avium, Rubus, Spiraea and Myrica.
