= Xestia laxa =

Scientific classification
- Kingdom: Animalia
- Phylum: Arthropoda
- Clade: Pancrustacea
- Class: Insecta
- Order: Lepidoptera
- Superfamily: Noctuoidea
- Family: Noctuidae
- Genus: Xestia
- Species: X. laxa

Binomial name
- Xestia laxa Lafontaine & Mikkola, 1998

Species of moth

Xestia laxa is a species of cutworm or dart moth in the family Noctuidae. It was described by J. Donald Lafontaine and Kauri Mikkola in 1998 and is found in North America.

The MONA or Hodges number for Xestia laxa is 10963.1.
