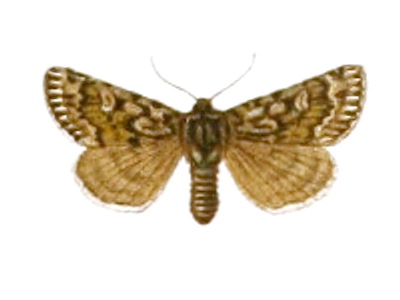

Scientific classification
- Kingdom: Animalia
- Phylum: Arthropoda
- Clade: Pancrustacea
- Class: Insecta
- Order: Lepidoptera
- Superfamily: Noctuoidea
- Family: Noctuidae
- Genus: Xestia
- Species: X. quieta

Binomial name
- Xestia quieta (Hübner, [1813])

Synonyms
- Noctua quieta Hübner, [1813]; Archanarta quieta; Anarta schoenherri Zetterstedt, [1839]; Lena poppiusi Herz, 1903; Anarta constricta Walker, 1857; Anarta rigida Walker, 1857

= Xestia quieta =

Species of moth

Xestia quieta is a moth of the family Noctuidae. It is known from northern Scandinavia, northern Siberia and northern North America (including Nunavut, the Northwest Territories, Yukon and Manitoba).

The wingspan is 25–29 mm. Adults are on wing in June and July in Sweden.

The larvae possibly feed on Empetrum species.

== Subspecies ==
- Xestia quieta quieta
- Xestia quieta constricta (Walker, 1857)
