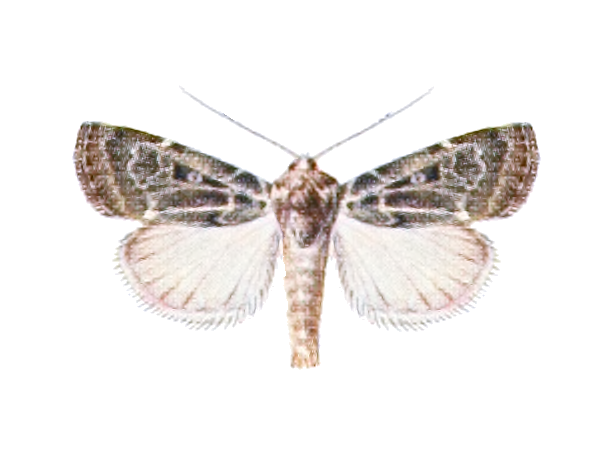

Scientific classification
- Domain: Eukaryota
- Kingdom: Animalia
- Phylum: Arthropoda
- Class: Insecta
- Order: Lepidoptera
- Superfamily: Noctuoidea
- Family: Noctuidae
- Genus: Xestia
- Species: X. caelebs

Binomial name
- Xestia caelebs (Staudinger, 1895)

Synonyms
- Agrotis caelebs Staudinger, 1895

= Xestia caelebs =

Species of moth

Xestia caelebs is a moth of the family Noctuidae. It is known from Xinjiang. The type location is described as between Lob Noor and Kuku Noor.
