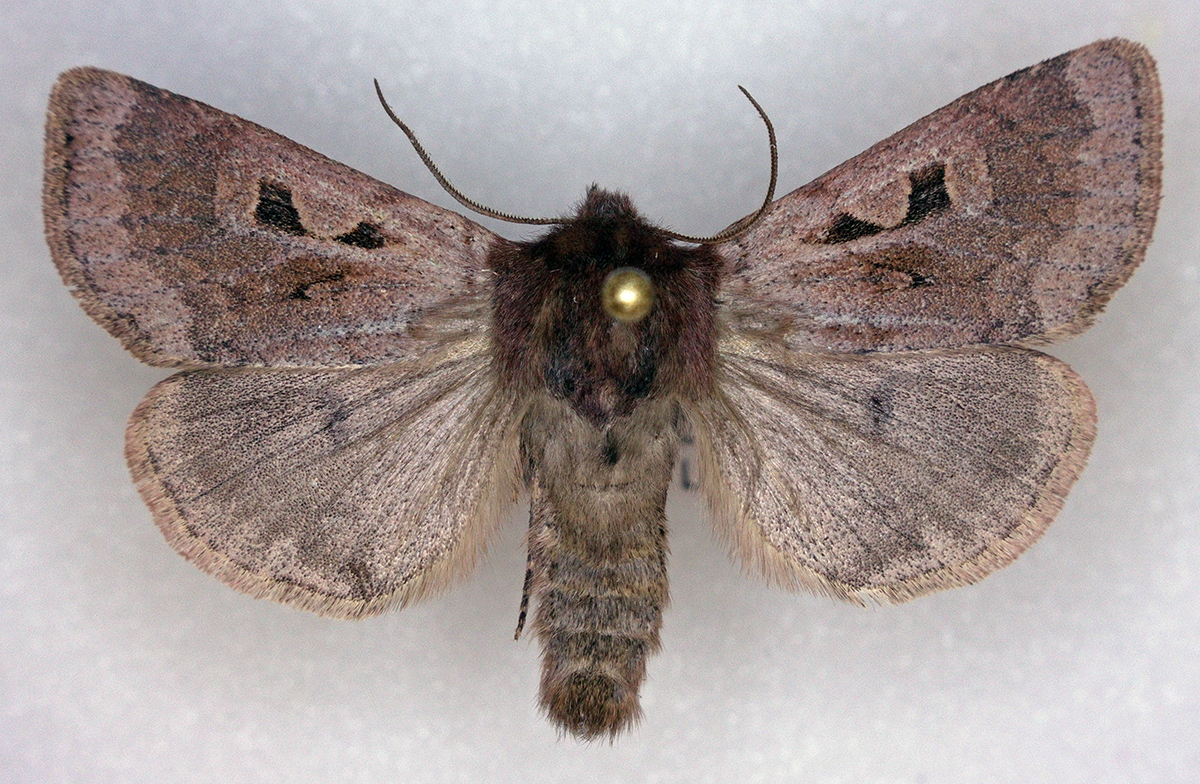

Scientific classification
- Kingdom: Animalia
- Phylum: Arthropoda
- Clade: Pancrustacea
- Class: Insecta
- Order: Lepidoptera
- Superfamily: Noctuoidea
- Family: Noctuidae
- Genus: Xestia
- Species: X. okakensis

Binomial name
- Xestia okakensis (Packard, 1867)

= Xestia okakensis =

Species of moth

Xestia okakensis is a species of cutworm or dart moth in the family Noctuidae.

== Subspecies ==
These two subspecies belong to the species Xestia okakensis:

- Xestia okakensis morandi (Benjamin, 1934)
- Xestia okakensis okakensis (Packard, 1867)
