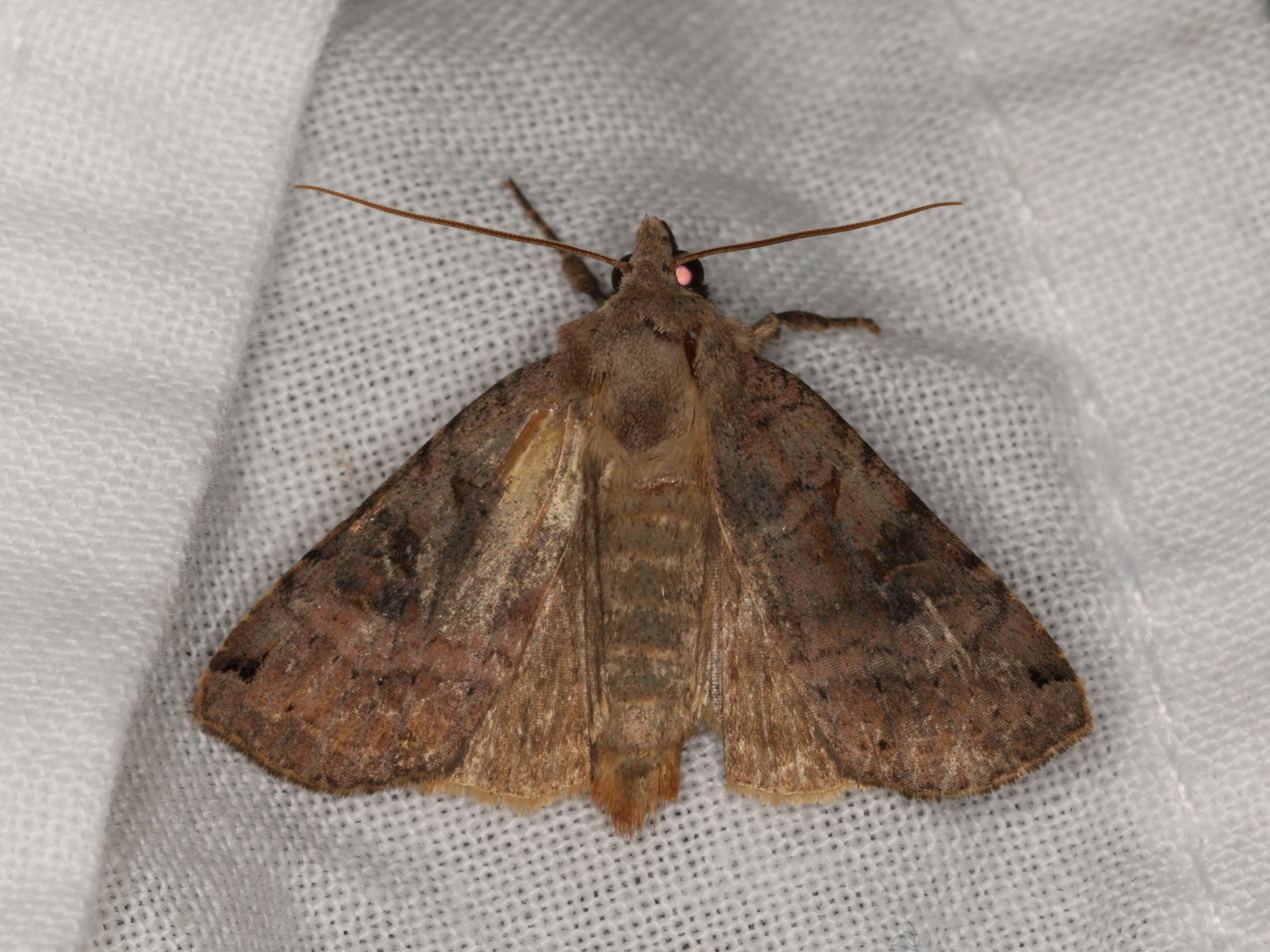

Scientific classification
- Kingdom: Animalia
- Phylum: Arthropoda
- Class: Insecta
- Order: Lepidoptera
- Superfamily: Noctuoidea
- Family: Noctuidae
- Genus: Xestia
- Species: X. smithii

Binomial name
- Xestia smithii (Snellen, 1896)

= Xestia smithii =

Species of moth

Xestia smithii, or Smith's dart, is a moth of the family Noctuidae. The species was first described by Pieter Cornelius Tobias Snellen in 1896. It is found across northern North America.
