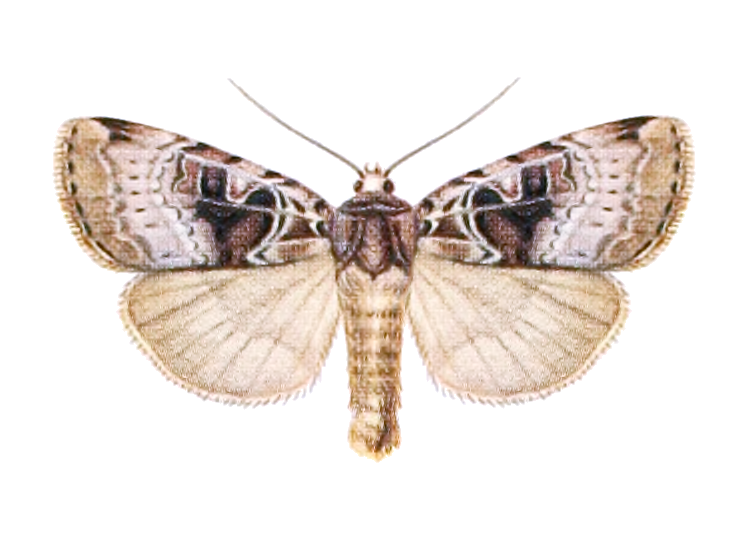

Scientific classification
- Domain: Eukaryota
- Kingdom: Animalia
- Phylum: Arthropoda
- Class: Insecta
- Order: Lepidoptera
- Superfamily: Noctuoidea
- Family: Noctuidae
- Genus: Xestia
- Species: X. kollari

Binomial name
- Xestia kollari (Lederer, 1853)

Synonyms
- Graphophora kollari Lederer, 1853

= Xestia kollari =

Species of moth

Xestia kollari is a moth of the family Noctuidae. It is known from the southern Urals to the Amur Region, northern Mongolia, Korea, Japan as well as from China, Ussuri and Kamchatka.

The wingspan is 45–55 mm.

== Subspecies ==
- Xestia kollari kollari (southern Urals to the Amur region, northern Mongolia, Korea, Japan)
- Xestia kollari plumbata Butler, 1881 (China, Ussuri, Kamchatka)
