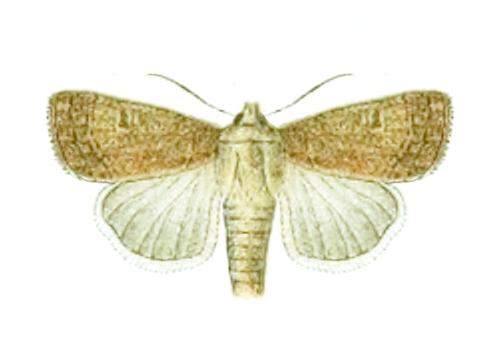

Scientific classification
- Domain: Eukaryota
- Kingdom: Animalia
- Phylum: Arthropoda
- Class: Insecta
- Order: Lepidoptera
- Superfamily: Noctuoidea
- Family: Noctuidae
- Genus: Xestia
- Species: X. palaestinensis

Binomial name
- Xestia palaestinensis (Kalchberg, 1897)

Synonyms
- Agrotis palaestinensis Kalchberg, 1897

= Xestia palaestinensis =

Species of moth

Xestia palaestinensis is a moth of the family Noctuidae. It is found in Greece, south-eastern Turkey, Lebanon, Israel, Syria, Jordan, northern Iraq and western Iran.

Adults are on wing from September to November. There is one generation per year.
