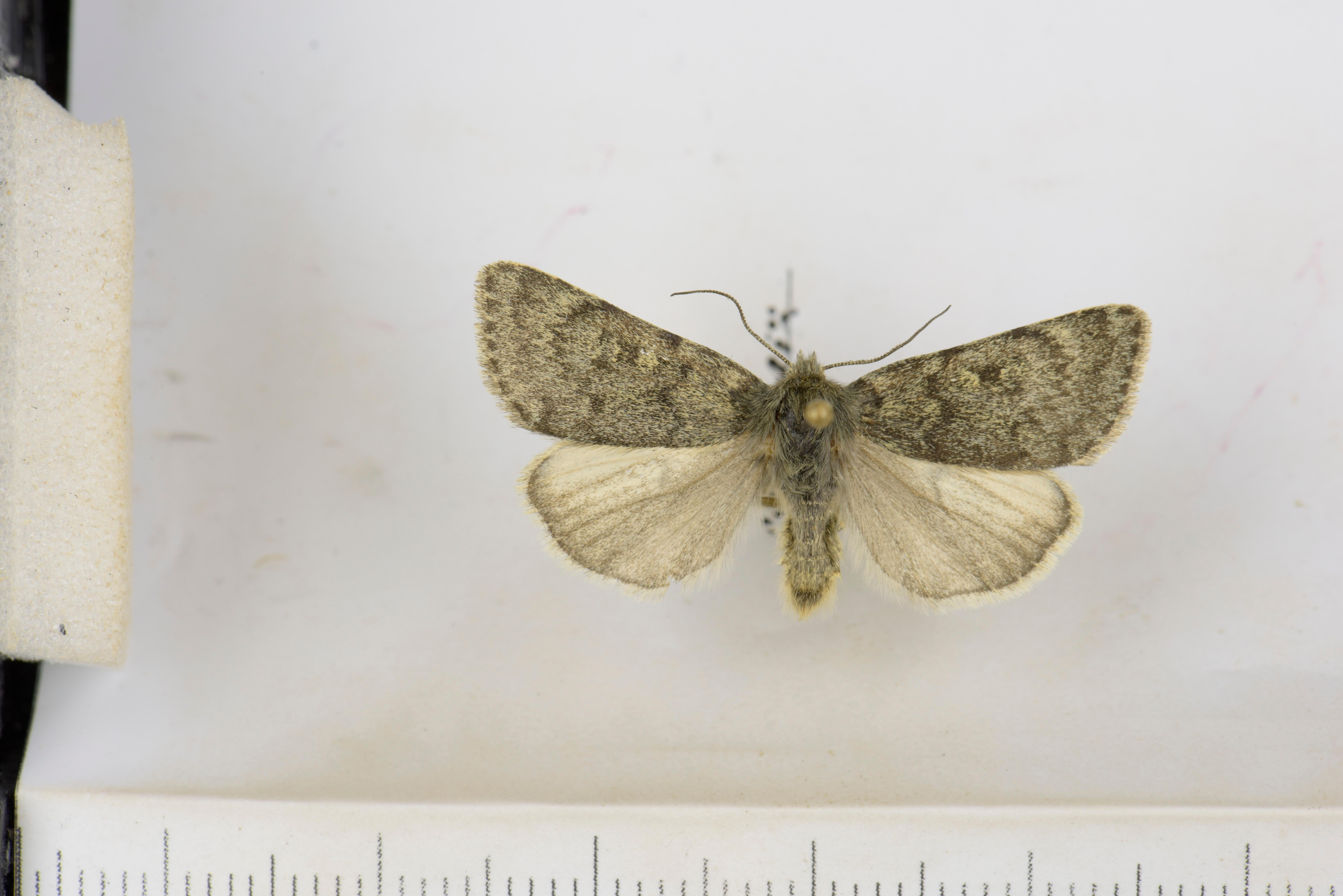

Scientific classification
- Domain: Eukaryota
- Kingdom: Animalia
- Phylum: Arthropoda
- Class: Insecta
- Order: Lepidoptera
- Superfamily: Noctuoidea
- Family: Noctuidae
- Genus: Xestia
- Species: X. lyngei

Binomial name
- Xestia lyngei (Rebel, 1923)

= Xestia lyngei =

Species of moth

Xestia lyngei is a species of moth belonging to the family Noctuidae.

It is native to Northern Europe and Subarctic America.
