= Hemigraphiphora =

Scientific classification
- Kingdom: Animalia
- Phylum: Arthropoda
- Clade: Pancrustacea
- Class: Insecta
- Order: Lepidoptera
- Superfamily: Noctuoidea
- Family: Noctuidae
- Subfamily: Noctuinae
- Genus: Hemigraphiphora; McDunnough, 1929
- Species: H. plebeia

Binomial name
- Hemigraphiphora plebeia (Smith, 1898)

Synonyms
- Xestia plebeia (Smith, 1898)

Genus of moths

Hemigraphiphora is a monotypic genus of moths of the family Noctuidae. It is here provisionally treated as separate from Xestia, though it seems closely related. Containing only the single species H. plebeia, its closest living relatives are not resolved and thus the genus' eventual fate depends on how Xestia is treated.
