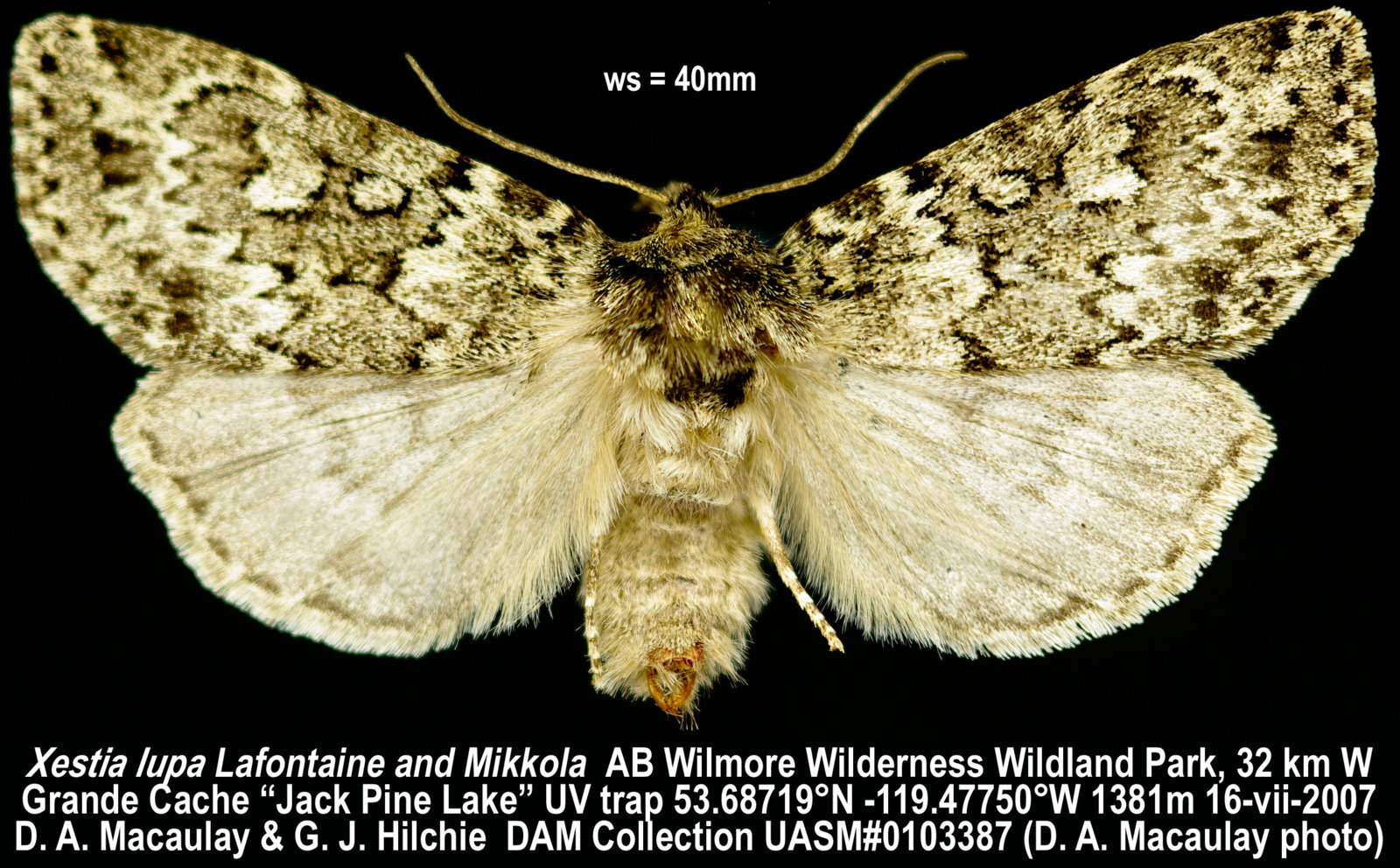

Scientific classification
- Domain: Eukaryota
- Kingdom: Animalia
- Phylum: Arthropoda
- Class: Insecta
- Order: Lepidoptera
- Superfamily: Noctuoidea
- Family: Noctuidae
- Tribe: Noctuini
- Subtribe: Noctuina
- Genus: Xestia
- Species: X. lupa

Binomial name
- Xestia lupa Lafontaine & Mikkola, 1998

= Xestia lupa =

Species of moth

Xestia lupa is a species of cutworm or dart moth in the family Noctuidae. It is found in North America.
