= Perinaenia =

Scientific classification
- Domain: Eukaryota
- Kingdom: Animalia
- Phylum: Arthropoda
- Class: Insecta
- Order: Lepidoptera
- Superfamily: Noctuoidea
- Family: Erebidae
- Subfamily: Calpinae
- Genus: Perinaenia; Butler, 1878
- Species: P. accipiter

Binomial name
- Perinaenia accipiter (Felder, 1874)

Synonyms
- Genus level: Anepilecta Warren, 1912; Species level: Perinaenia lignosa Butler, 1878; Spintherops accipiter Felder, 1874; Xestia accipiter (Felder, 1874)

Genus of moths

Perinaenia is a monotypic moth genus of the family Erebidae erected by Arthur Gardiner Butler in 1878. Its only species, Perinaenia accipiter, was first described by Felder in 1874. It is here provisionally treated as separate from Xestia, though it seems closely related. Its closest living relatives are not resolved and thus the genus' eventual fate depends on how Xestia is treated.

This species is known from western China, northern India, Tibet and Japan.
