= Xestia verniloides =

Scientific classification
- Kingdom: Animalia
- Phylum: Arthropoda
- Clade: Pancrustacea
- Class: Insecta
- Order: Lepidoptera
- Superfamily: Noctuoidea
- Family: Noctuidae
- Genus: Xestia
- Species: X. verniloides

Binomial name
- Xestia verniloides Lafontaine, 1998

Species of moth

Xestia verniloides is a species of cutworm or dart moth in the family Noctuidae. It was described by J. Donald Lafontaine in 1998 and is found in North America.

The MONA or Hodges number for Xestia verniloides is 10973.1.
