= Xestia liquidaria =

Scientific classification
- Domain: Eukaryota
- Kingdom: Animalia
- Phylum: Arthropoda
- Class: Insecta
- Order: Lepidoptera
- Superfamily: Noctuoidea
- Family: Noctuidae
- Genus: Xestia
- Species: X. liquidaria

Binomial name
- Xestia liquidaria (Eversmann, 1848)

Synonyms
- Xestia fasciata (Skinner, 1902)

Species of moth

Xestia liquidaria is a species of cutworm or dart moth in the family Noctuidae. It is found in Europe and Northern Asia (excluding China) and North America.

The MONA or Hodges number for Xestia liquidaria is 10934.
