= Xestia ornata =

Scientific classification
- Domain: Eukaryota
- Kingdom: Animalia
- Phylum: Arthropoda
- Class: Insecta
- Order: Lepidoptera
- Superfamily: Noctuoidea
- Family: Noctuidae
- Genus: Xestia
- Species: X. ornata

Binomial name
- Xestia ornata (Staudinger, 1892)

Synonyms
- Eugraphe ornata (Staudinger, 1892); Hydrilla ornata Staudinger, 1892

Species of moth

Xestia ornata is a moth of the family Noctuidae. It is found from the northern Tien-Shan Mountains through the Pamirs and Hissar-Darwaz system to eastern Afghanistan (Nuristan).

The wingspan is 32–37 mm.
