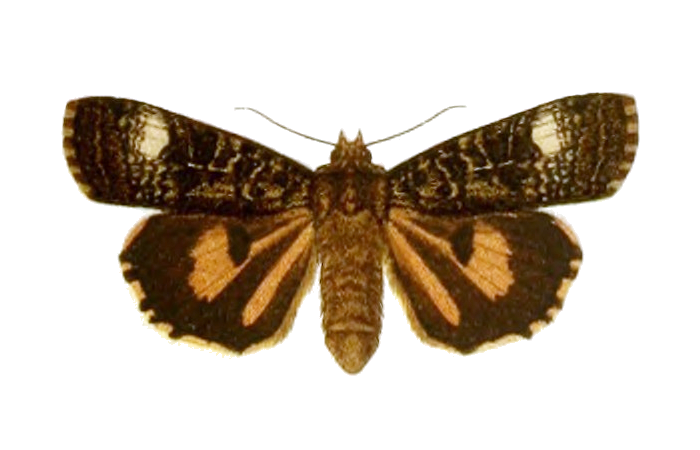

Scientific classification
- Domain: Eukaryota
- Kingdom: Animalia
- Phylum: Arthropoda
- Class: Insecta
- Order: Lepidoptera
- Superfamily: Noctuoidea
- Family: Noctuidae
- Genus: Xestia
- Species: X. efflorescens

Binomial name
- Xestia efflorescens (Butler, 1879)

Synonyms
- Noctua efflorescens Butler, 1879; Triphaena jankowskii Oberthür, 1884

= Xestia efflorescens =

Species of moth

Xestia efflorescens is a moth of the family Noctuidae. It is known from eastern Asia, the Amur Region, Korea and Japan.

The wingspan is 40–45 mm.
