= Xestia isolata =

Scientific classification
- Kingdom: Animalia
- Phylum: Arthropoda
- Clade: Pancrustacea
- Class: Insecta
- Order: Lepidoptera
- Superfamily: Noctuoidea
- Family: Noctuidae
- Genus: Xestia
- Species: X. isolata

Binomial name
- Xestia isolata (Holloway, 1976)

Synonyms
- Amathes isolata Holloway, 1976

Species of moth

Xestia isolata is a moth of the family Noctuidae. It is endemic to Borneo.
