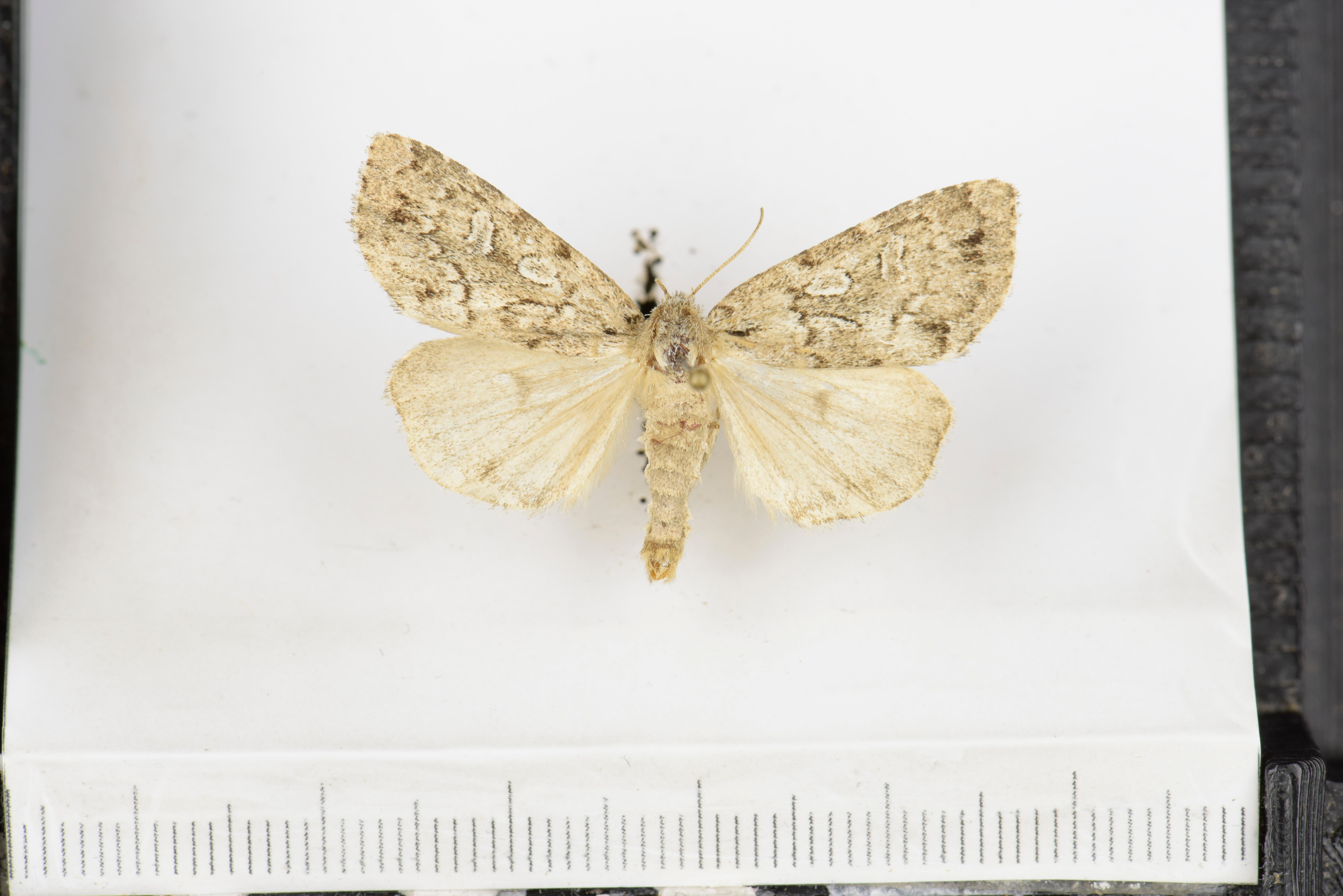

Scientific classification
- Domain: Eukaryota
- Kingdom: Animalia
- Phylum: Arthropoda
- Class: Insecta
- Order: Lepidoptera
- Superfamily: Noctuoidea
- Family: Noctuidae
- Genus: Xestia
- Species: X. distensa

Binomial name
- Xestia distensa (Eversmann, 1851)

Synonyms
- Caradrina distensa Eversmann, 1851

= Xestia distensa =

Species of moth

Xestia distensa is a species of moth belonging to the family Noctuidae.
