= Xestia cinerascens =

Scientific classification
- Kingdom: Animalia
- Phylum: Arthropoda
- Clade: Pancrustacea
- Class: Insecta
- Order: Lepidoptera
- Superfamily: Noctuoidea
- Family: Noctuidae
- Tribe: Noctuini
- Subtribe: Noctuina
- Genus: Xestia
- Species: X. cinerascens

Binomial name
- Xestia cinerascens (Smith, 1891)

Species of moth

Xestia cinerascens is a species of cutworm or dart moth in the family Noctuidae. It is found in North America.

The MONA or Hodges number for Xestia cinerascens is 10949.
