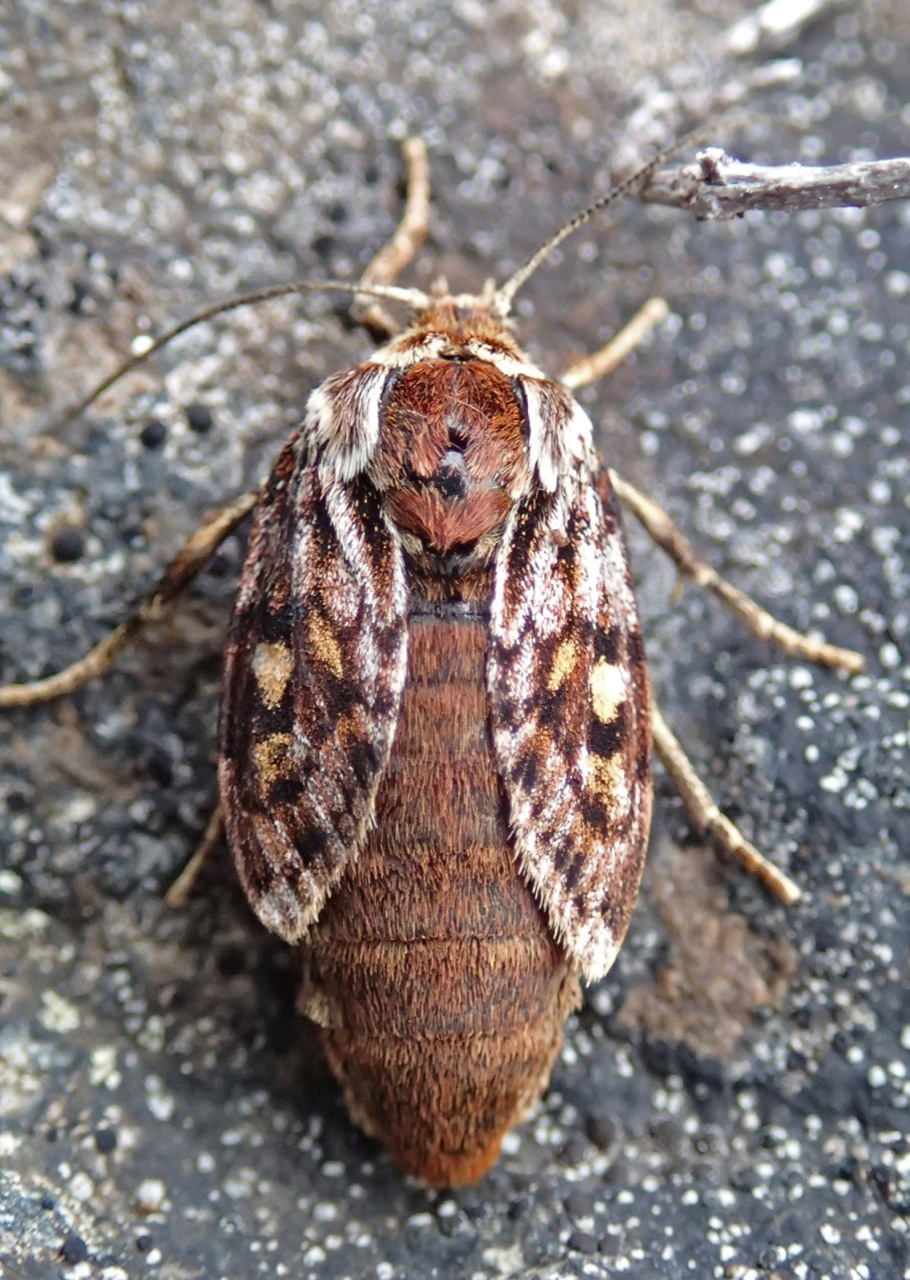

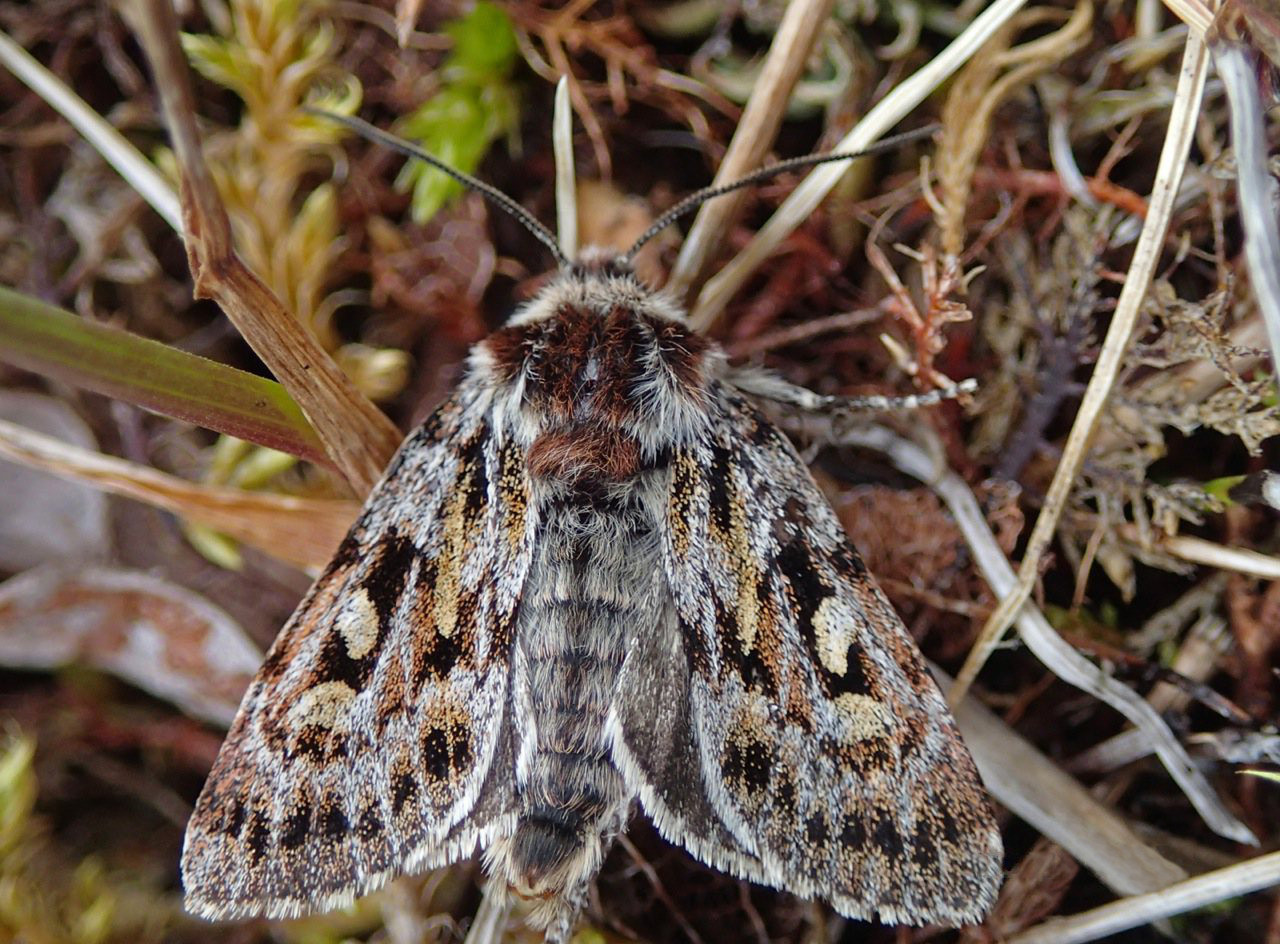

Scientific classification
- Kingdom: Animalia
- Phylum: Arthropoda
- Class: Insecta
- Order: Lepidoptera
- Superfamily: Noctuoidea
- Family: Noctuidae
- Genus: Xestia
- Species: X. alaskae

Binomial name
- Xestia alaskae (Grote, 1876)

Synonyms
- Agrotis alaskae; Pachnobia alaskae; Epipsiliamorpha alaskae; Agrotiphila alaskae

= Xestia alaskae =

Species of moctuid moth from North America

Xestia alaskae is a moth of the family Noctuidae. It is found in the Yukon Territory and Alaska.
