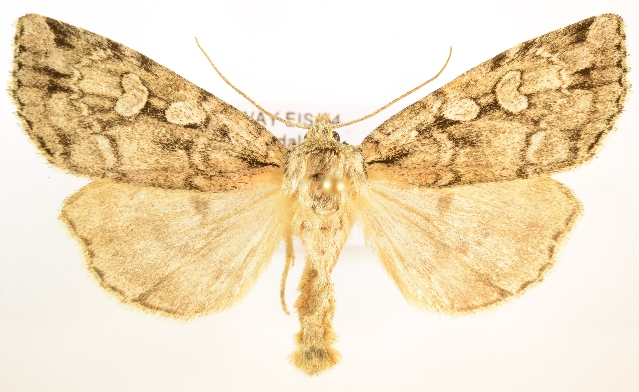

Scientific classification
- Domain: Eukaryota
- Kingdom: Animalia
- Phylum: Arthropoda
- Class: Insecta
- Order: Lepidoptera
- Superfamily: Noctuoidea
- Family: Noctuidae
- Genus: Xestia
- Species: X. fennica

Binomial name
- Xestia fennica (Brandt, 1936)

Synonyms
- Anomogyna rhaetica subsp. fennica Brandt, 1936

= Xestia fennica =

Species of moth

Xestia fennica is a species of moth belonging to the family Noctuidae. It was formerly considered a subspecies of Xestia rhaetica.
