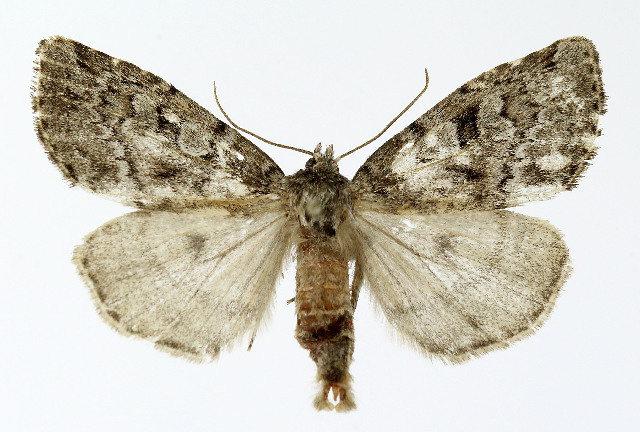

Scientific classification
- Domain: Eukaryota
- Kingdom: Animalia
- Phylum: Arthropoda
- Class: Insecta
- Order: Lepidoptera
- Superfamily: Noctuoidea
- Family: Noctuidae
- Genus: Xestia
- Species: X. laetabilis

Binomial name
- Xestia laetabilis (Zetterstedt, 1839)

= Xestia laetabilis =

Species of moth

Xestia laetabilis is a species of moth belonging to the family Noctuidae.

It is native to Northern Europe.
