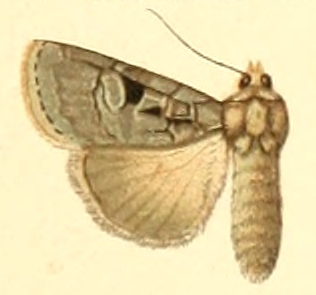

Scientific classification
- Domain: Eukaryota
- Kingdom: Animalia
- Phylum: Arthropoda
- Class: Insecta
- Order: Lepidoptera
- Superfamily: Noctuoidea
- Family: Noctuidae
- Genus: Xestia
- Species: X. sareptana

Binomial name
- Xestia sareptana (Herrich-Schäffer, 1851)

Synonyms
- Noctua sareptana Herrich-Schäffer, [1851]; Rhyacia sareptana

= Xestia sareptana =

Species of moth

Xestia sareptana is a moth of the family Noctuidae. It is known from few localities in the European part of south-eastern Russia, Turkey, the Caucasus region, western Iran, Lebanon and Israel.

Adults are on wing in September to October. There is one generation per year.
