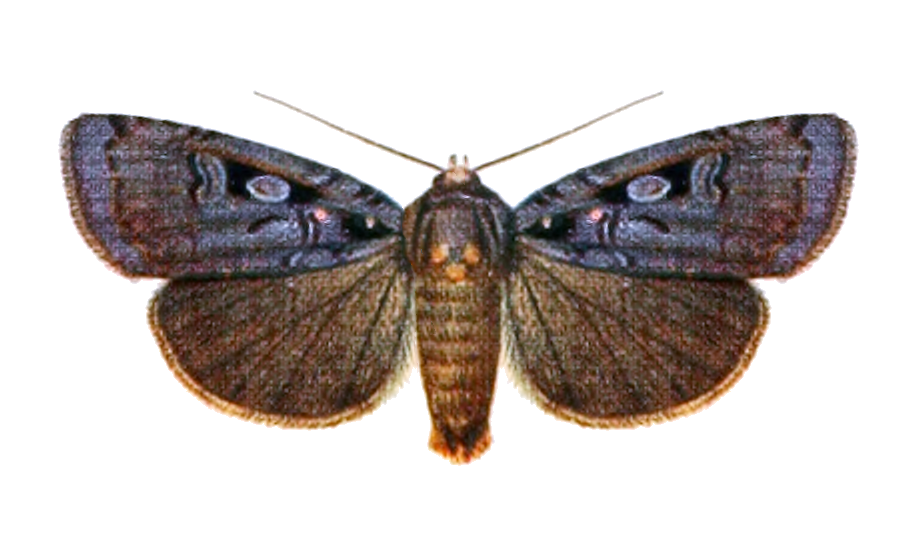

Scientific classification
- Domain: Eukaryota
- Kingdom: Animalia
- Phylum: Arthropoda
- Class: Insecta
- Order: Lepidoptera
- Superfamily: Noctuoidea
- Family: Noctuidae
- Genus: Xestia
- Species: X. renalis

Binomial name
- Xestia renalis (Moore, 1881)

Synonyms
- Axylia renalis Moore, 1881

= Xestia renalis =

Species of moth

Xestia renalis is a moth of the family Noctuidae. It is known from Punjab.
