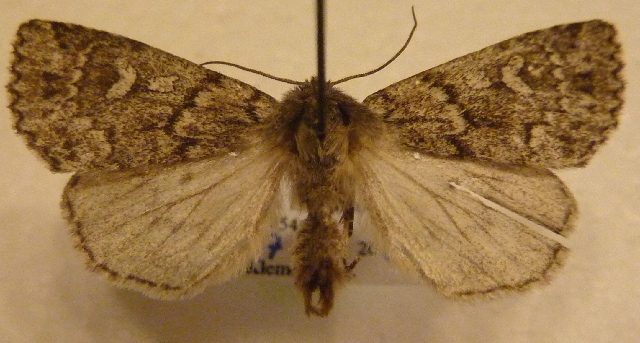

Scientific classification
- Domain: Eukaryota
- Kingdom: Animalia
- Phylum: Arthropoda
- Class: Insecta
- Order: Lepidoptera
- Superfamily: Noctuoidea
- Family: Noctuidae
- Genus: Xestia
- Species: X. borealis

Binomial name
- Xestia borealis (Nordström, 1933)

Synonyms
- Aplectoides borealis Nordström, 1933

= Xestia borealis =

Species of moth

Xestia borealis is a species of moth belonging to the family Noctuidae.
