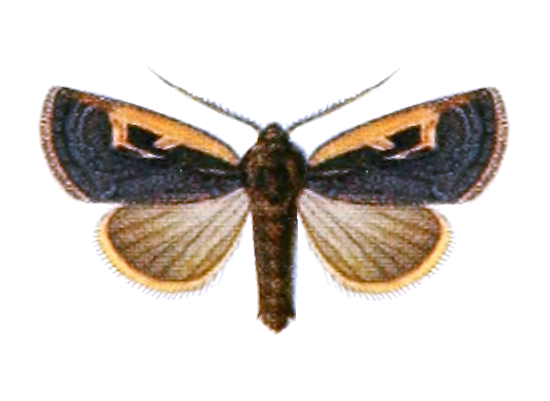

Scientific classification
- Kingdom: Animalia
- Phylum: Arthropoda
- Class: Insecta
- Order: Lepidoptera
- Superfamily: Noctuoidea
- Family: Noctuidae
- Genus: Xestia
- Species: X. retracta

Binomial name
- Xestia retracta (Hampson, 1903)

= Xestia retracta =

Species of moth

Xestia retracta is a moth of the family Noctuidae. It is known from Sikkim.
