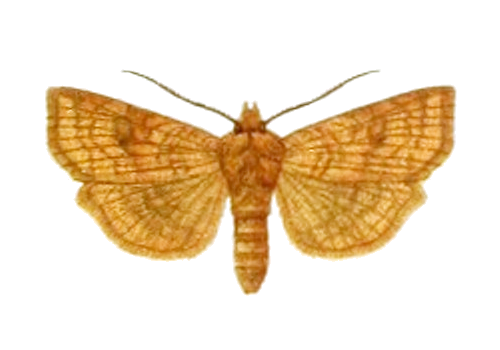
- Xestia ochreago, the type species

Scientific classification
- Kingdom: Animalia
- Phylum: Arthropoda
- Clade: Pancrustacea
- Class: Insecta
- Order: Lepidoptera
- Superfamily: Noctuoidea
- Family: Noctuidae
- Subtribe: Noctuina
- Genus: Xestia; Hübner, 1818

Type species
- Noctua ochreago Hübner, 1790

Diversity
- Probably over 100 species (but see text)

Synonyms
- Numerous, see text

= Xestia =

Genus of noctuid moths

Xestia is a genus of noctuid moths (family Noctuidae). They are the type genus of the tribe Xestiini in subfamily Noctuinae, though some authors merge this tribe with the Noctuini. Species in this genus are commonly known as "clays", "darts" or "rustics", but such names are commonplace among Noctuidae. Xestia moths have a wide distribution, though they most prominently occur in the Holarctic.

With almost 200 species included at one time, Xestia was something of a "wastebin genus". But almost half of the traditional species are now placed elsewhere (see below), and some of the remaining ones are liable to be assigned to another genus also. On the other hand, new moths that probably do belong in this genus are still being discovered (e.g. X. hypographa, which led to the 2002 transfer of X. ornata from Eugraphe to here). Thus, unless there are drastic taxonomic changes in the future, Xestia is likely to remain one of the larger noctuine genera.

== Ecology ==
Xestia adults are usually of medium size and robust build, with stout hairy bodies and strong wings. Some are quite colorful, with bold lighter markings and hindwings in delicate yellowish, reddish or bluish hues. Generally, they are cryptic while at rest however, with unmarked pale or dull brownish hindwings; they do not have metallic hues and few species possess obvious eyespots.

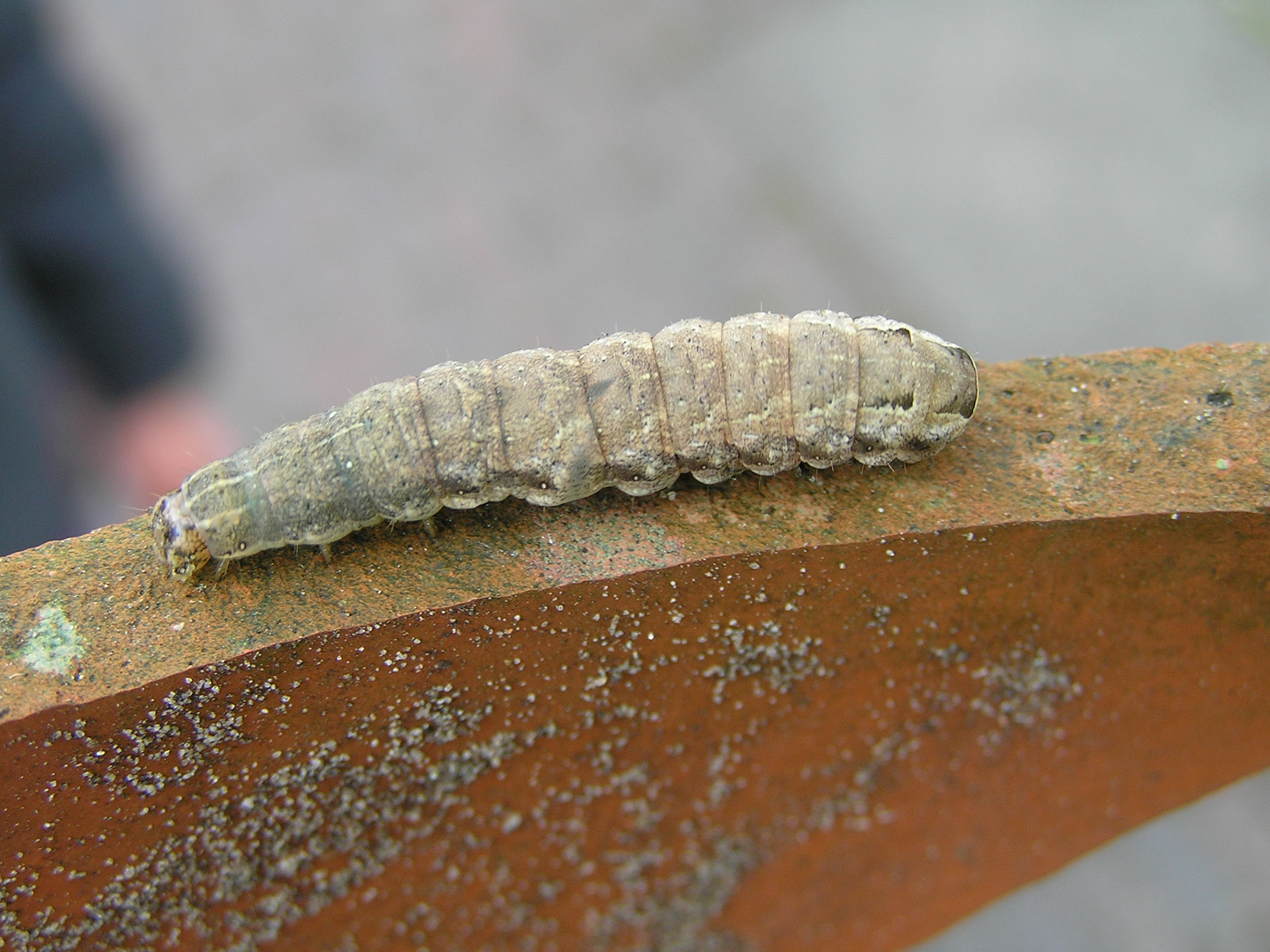
Caterpillar of the double square-spot (X. triangulum)

This genus includes many species living at high latitudes and altitudes, in tundra and taiga ecosystems. Some have two-year (semivoltine) life cycles and only occur as adults every other year; typically the caterpillar larva overwinters to pupate in spring, with the moths flying around midsummer, but some species eclose later, their moths flying from late summer into autumn. Xestia caterpillars are generally stout and cryptically colored; in some species they have quite prominent dark lengthwise spots, but may e.g. be entirely green or whatever else gives best camouflage.

Some species' larvae are notoriously polyphagous, e.g. the setaceous Hebrew character (X. c-nigrum), the food of which includes all sorts of core eudicots – including solanaceae and others which are poisonous to many herbivores – as well as some monocots. The latter are mainly Poaceae however, and few other monocots are utilized by Xestia larvae in general. Ericaceae, as well as Betulaceae and Poaceae, are key food plants for many of the high-latitude species. Gymnosperms are food plants of secondary importance in this genus, but Pinaceae form the mainstay or exclusive food of some species which occasionally become more than nuisance pests. Altogether, Xestia moths are only known as major pests within limited areas or in regard to specific plants, in which cases damage can be economically significant though.

Even though the larval food plants of many Xestia species are not or insufficiently known, those on record are from all major lineages of core eudicots. Among the basal core eudicots, Caryophyllales (especially Polygonaceae) are particularly significant, of the asterids the Asterales (especially Asteraceae), Ericales (especially Ericaceae) and Lamiales (especially Plantaginaceae), and of the rosids the Malpighiales (numerous families) and Rosales (especially Rosaceae). Less important asterid orders among Xestia food plants are for example Dipsacales, Gentianales and Solanales, of the rosids e.g. Fabales, Fagales, Malvales, Myrtales and Sapindales. More basal (mes)angiosperms do not seem to be significant as Xestia food plants, at least not in temperate and cooler regions.

As far as is known, Xestia adults are nocturnal or crepuscular (except of course the high-latitude species), but are often attracted to lights at night. They general feed on flowers with relatively short or no corolla, and will also drink other sugary liquids.

== Systematics and taxonomy ==
Several species formerly placed here are now in Agnorisma and Pseudohermonassa; whether other genera are accepted varies among authors; Estimata, Hemigraphiphora and Perinaenia are provisionally considered distinct here. "Xestia" versuta does not seem to belong in the present genus; it may be an aberrant member of Goniographa, but until this is resolved it is here treated under its original name Eugraphe versuta.

Furthermore, a case for separation has in particular been made for Amathes (possibly including Agrotiphila), Lytaea, Megasema (possibly including Megarhomba), Segetia and Schoyenia (with Archanarta occasionally also separate), but these are here included in Xestia. Some of them are, however, recognized as subgenera, and if the genus is split further would be first to become elevated in rank again. There is no real good justification for either treatment, except that the lengthy process of a thorough revision of noctuine systematics and taxonomy has only progressed so far. H. Beck in 1996 published a comprehensive taxonomic catalogue, introducing generic names for most European groups of (presumably) related species. While few of these seem to stand any chance ever to be widely recognized as distinct genera, this step is likely to have made available a generic name for any taxa that are eventually split from Xestia sensu stricto.

=== Synonyms ===
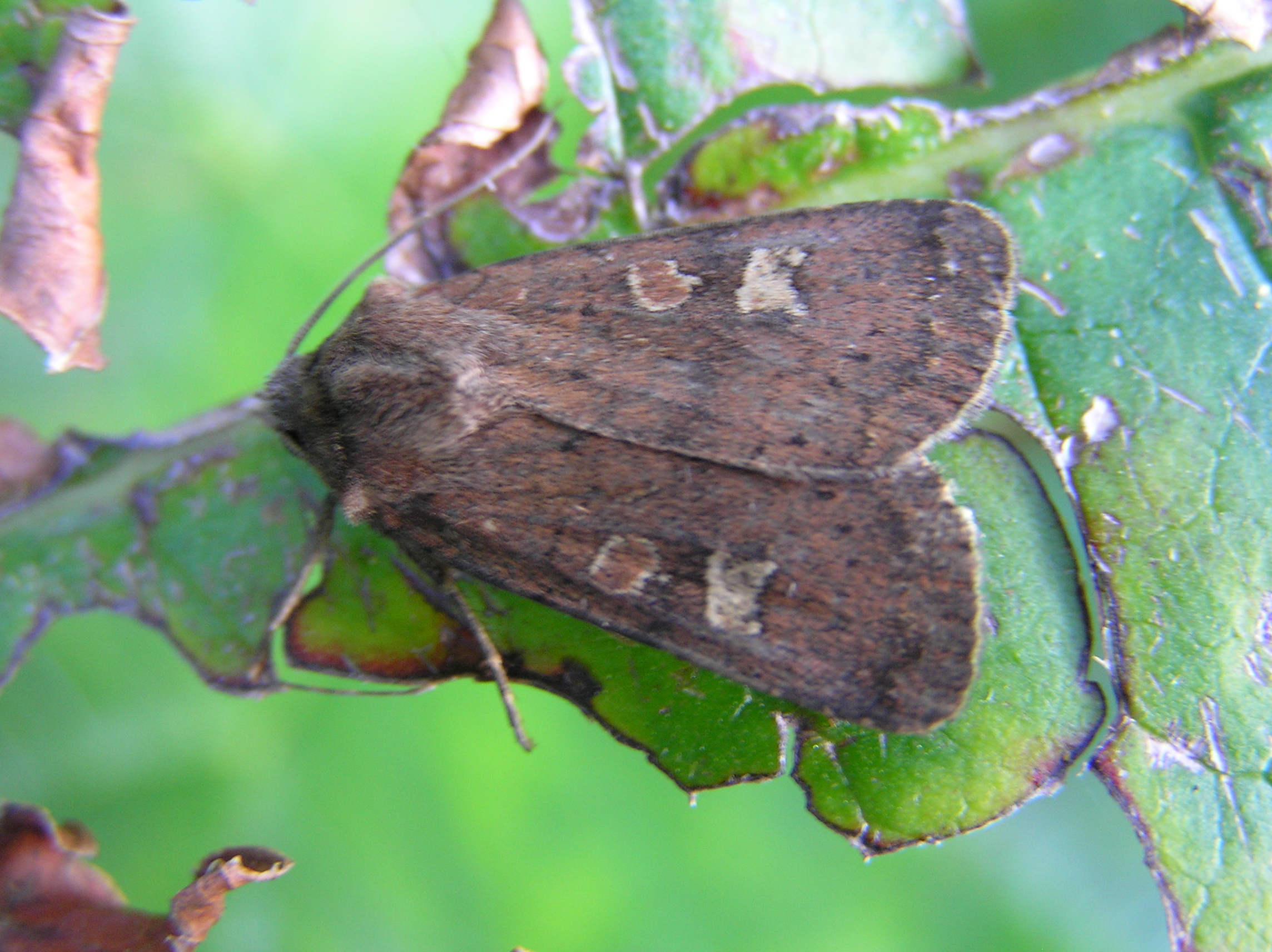
Square-spot rustic (X. xanthographa), sometimes split off in Segetia with its presumed relatives, seems too close to X. ochreago to warrant such a treatment.

Junior synonyms and other obsolete generic names for Xestia moths are:

- Agrotimorpha Barnes & Benjamin, 1929
- Agrotiphila Grote, 1876
- Amathes Hübner, [1821]
- Anomogyna Staudinger, 1871
- Archanarta Barnes & Benjamin, 1929
- Ashworthia Beck, 1996
- Asworthia (lapsus)
- Barrovia Barnes & McDunnough, 1916
- Calamogyna (lapsus)
- Calanomogyna Beck, 1996
- Calocestia (lapsus)
- Caloxestia Beck, 1996
- Castanasta Beck, 1996
- Cenigria Beck, 1996
- Epipsiliamorpha Barnes & Benjamin, 1929
- Ericathia Beck, 1996
- Hiptelia Guenée, 1852
- Hypoxestia Hampson, 1903
- Hyptioxesta Rebel, 1901
- Knappia Nye, 1975
- Lankialaia Beck, 1996
- Lena Herz, 1903 (non Casey, 1886 preoccupied)
- Litaea (lapsus)
- Lorezea (lapsus)
- Lorezia Beck, 1996
- Lytaea Stephens, 1829
- Megarhomba Beck, 1996
- Megasema Hübner, [1821]
- Monticollia Beck, 1996
- Pachnobia Guenée, 1852
- Palaeamathes Boursin, 1964
- Paramathes Boursin, 1964
- Palkermes Beck, 1996
- Palkkermes (lapsus)
- Peranomogyna Beck, 1996
- Platagrotis Smith, 1890
- Pteroscia Morrison, 1875
- Schoyenia Aurivillius, 1883
- Segetia Stephens, 1829
- Synanomogyna Beck, 1996
- Xenopachnobia Beck, 1996

== Species ==
The 110 or so species here placed in Xestia are divided among five subgenera. Two of these are further divided into groups, which are based on phenetic similarity however and may or may not form clades and/or species complexes. Some of these would presumably warrant recognition as subgenera if the present-day subgenera are split off; the subgeneric names that would apply are given (if known) in the addition to the species-group names.

About one-third of the species here included in Xestia are incertae sedis (of unclear assignment). Among this group are a few species which are extremely little known, having been described long ago but studied only once or twice since then.

=== Subgenus Anomogyna ===
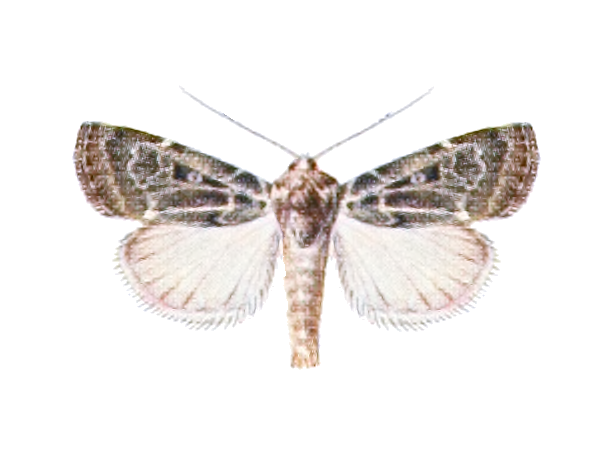
X. (Anomogyna) caelebs, adult male

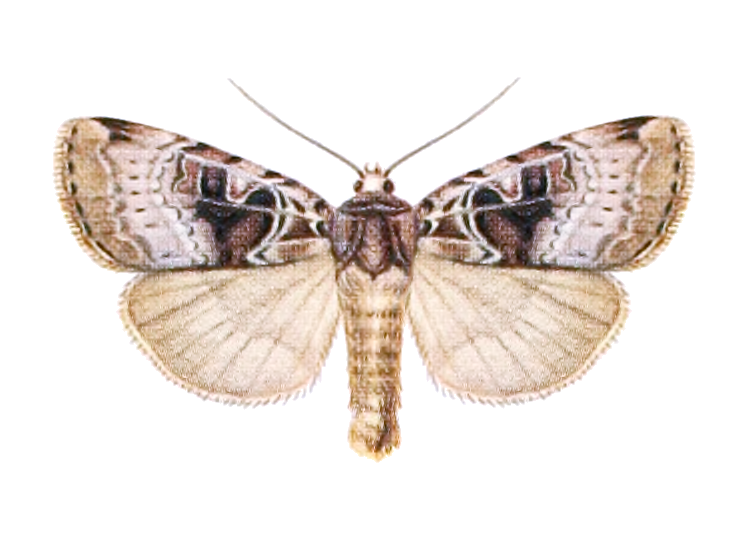
X. (Megasema) kollari kollari, adult male

- Xestia albuncula (Eversmann, 1851)
- Xestia alpicola – northern dart (type of Xenopachnobia)
- Xestia badicollis – northern variable dart, northern conifer dart, white pine cutworm (possibly belongs in X. elimata)
- Xestia borealis (Nordström, 1933)
- Xestia brunneopicta (Matsumura, 1925)
- Xestia caelebs
- Xestia dilucida – dull reddish dart, reddish heath dart
- Xestia distensa (Eversmann, 1851) (sometimes in X. laetabilis)
- Xestia elimata – southern variable dart, variable climbing caterpillar
- Xestia fabulosa (Ferguson, 1965)
- Xestia fennica (Brandt, 1936)
- Xestia gelida (Sparre-Schneider, 1883) (type of Peranomogyna)
- Xestia imperita (Hübner, [1831])
- Xestia infimatis Grote, 1880 (tentatively placed here, may belong in subgenus Xestia)
- Xestia laetabilis (Zetterstedt, [1839]) (type of Anomogyna)
- Xestia mustelina Smith, 1900
- Xestia perquiritata – boomerang dart
- Xestia praevia (possibly belongs in X. elimata)
- Xestia rhaetica (type of Synanomogyna)
- Xestia sincera (type of Calanomogyna)
- Xestia speciosa (type of Platagrotis)
- Xestia vernilis Grote, 1879
- Xestia viridiscens (Turati, 1919) (sometimes in X. speciosa)
- Xestia yatsugadakeana (Matsumura, 1926)

=== Subgenus Megasema ===
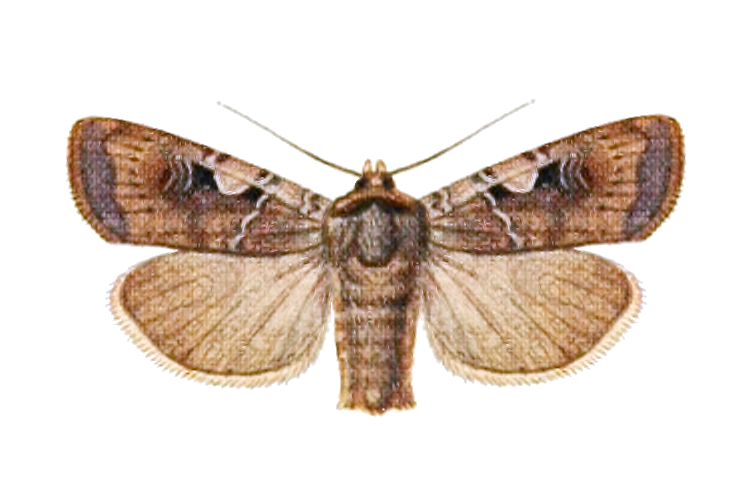
X. (Megasema) c-nigrum deraiota, adult male

ashworthii/"Ashworthia" group

- Xestia ashworthii – Ashworth's rustic (type of Ashworthia)
- Xestia okakensis Packard, 1867
  - Xestia okakensis okakensis Packard, 1867
  - Xestia okakensis morandi (Benjamin, 1934) (sometimes considered distinct species)
- Xestia scropulana Morrison, 1874 (formerly in X. wockei)
- Xestia wockei

kollari group

- Xestia kollari

c-nigrum group

- Xestia c-nigrum – setaceous Hebrew character, "spotted cutworm" (type of Cenigria)
- Xestia ditrapezium – triple-spotted clay
- Xestia dolosa – greater black-letter dart, woodland spotted cutworm, "spotted cutworm"
- Xestia praetermissa Warren (possibly belongs in X. c-nigrum)
- Xestia triangulum – double square-spot (type of Megasema)

Species group unknown

- Xestia inuitica Lafontaine & Hensel, 1998

=== Subgenus Pachnobia ===
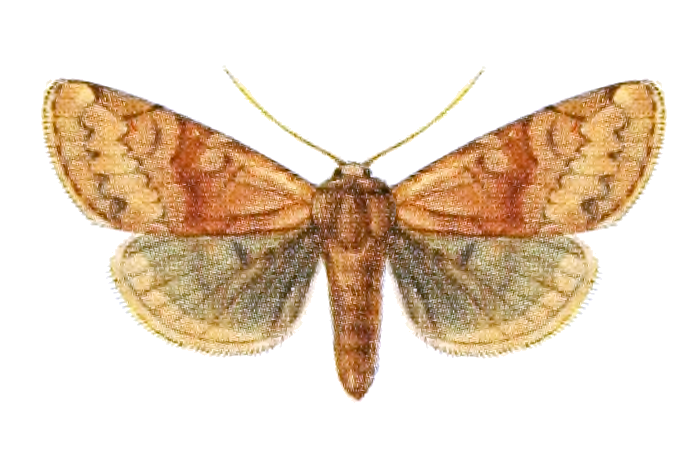
X. (Pachnobia) lorezi lorezi, adult male

- Xestia alaskae (type of Epipsiliamorpha; tentatively placed here, may belong in subgenus Schoyenia)
- Xestia atrata (Morrison, 1875) (type of Pteroscia)
  - Xestia atrata atrata (Morrison, 1874)
  - Xestia atrata filipjevi (Shljuzhko, 1926)
  - Xestia atrata haraldi Fibiger, 1997
  - Xestia atrata ursae (McDunnough, 1940)
  - Xestia atrata yukona (McDunnough, 1921)
- Xestia kolymae (Herz, 1903)
- Xestia kruegeri Kononenko & Schmitz, 2004
- Xestia laxa Lafontaine & Mikkola, 1998
- Xestia lorezi (type of Lorezia)
- Xestia lupa Lafontaine & Mikkola, 1998
- Xestia penthima (Erschoff, 1870) (type of Hyptioxesta)
- Xestia tecta (Hübner, [1808]) (type of Pachnobia)
  - Xestia tecta tecta (Hübner, [1808])
  - Xestia tecta tectoides (Corti, 1926)

=== Subgenus Schoyenia ===
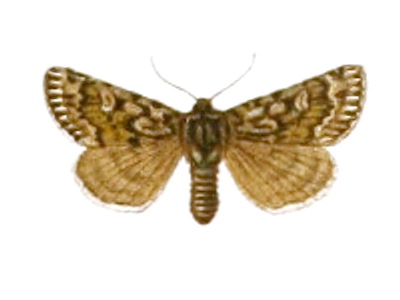
X. (Schoyenia) quieta, adult

- Xestia aequaeva (Benjamin, 1934)
  - Xestia aequaeva aequaeva (Benjamin, 1934)
  - Xestia aequaeva glaucina Lafontaine & Mikkola, 1996
- Xestia brachiptera (Kononenko, 1981)
- Xestia bryanti (Benjamin, 1933) (= X. acraea)
- Xestia fergusoni Lafontaine, 1983
- Xestia intermedia (Kononenko, 1981)
- Xestia liquidaria (Eversmann, 1848) (= X. arctica Aurivillius, 1883 (non Zetterstedt, 1839: preoccupied), X. fasciata, X. unifasciata; type of Schoyenia)
- Xestia lyngei (Rebel, 1923) (type of Lankialaia)
  - Xestia lyngei lyngei (Rebel, 1923)
  - Xestia lyngei aborigenea Kononenko, 1983
  - Xestia lyngei lankialai (Grönblom, 1962))
- Xestia magadanensis Kononenko & Lafontaine, 1983
- Xestia quieta (type of Archanarta)
- Xestia similis Kononenko 1981
- Xestia thula Lafontaine & Kononenko, 1983
- Xestia woodi Lafontaine & Kononenko, 1983

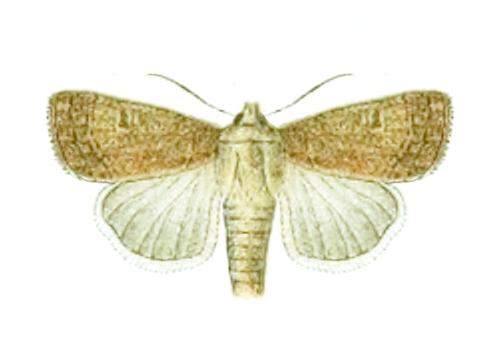
X. (Xestia) palaestinensis, adult female

=== Subgenus Xestia ===
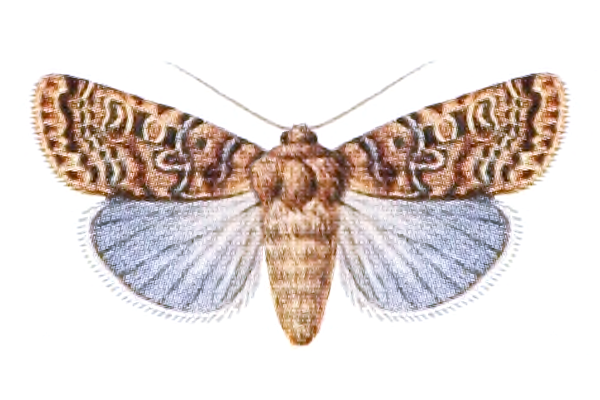
X. (Xestia) bolteri, adult female

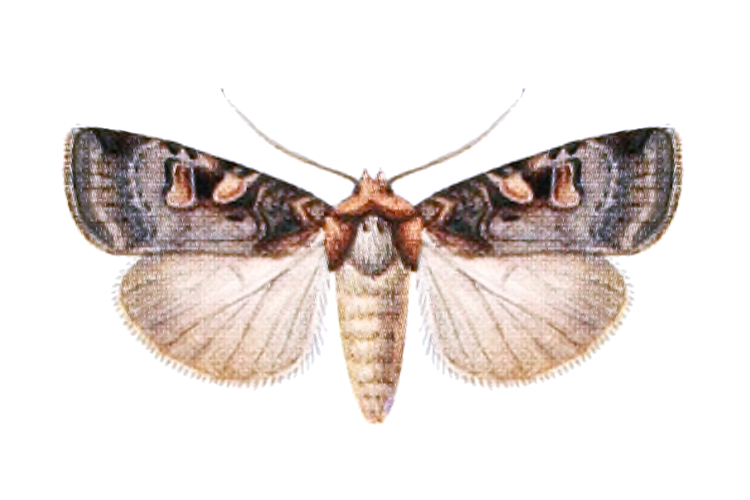
X. (Xestia) conchis, adult female

baja/"Amathes" group

- Xestia baja – dotted clay (type of Amathes)
- Xestia smithii – Smith's dart (possibly belongs in X. baja)

castanea/"Castanasta/Ericathia" group

- Xestia agathina – heath rustic (type of Ericathia)
- Xestia castanea – grey rustic, The Neglected (type of Castanasta)
- Xestia jordani (Turati, 1912)

collina/"Monticollia" group

- Xestia collina (type of Monticollia)

ochreago group

- Xestia ochreago

sexstrigata/"Lytaea" group

- Xestia sexstrigata – six-striped rustic (type of Lytaea)

stigmatica/"Megarhomba" group (= "rhomboidea group", misidentification)

- Xestia sareptana
- Xestia stigmatica – square-spotted clay (type of Megarhomba)

trifida/"Caloxestia" group

- Xestia trifida (type of Caloxestia)

xanthographa/"Segetia" group

- Xestia cohaesa
- Xestia kermesina (Mabille, 1869) (type of Palkermes)
  - Xestia kermesina kermesina (Mabille, 1869)
  - Xestia kermesina virescens Turati, 1912
- Xestia palaestinensis
- Xestia xanthographa – square-spot rustic (type of Segetia)

Species group unknown

- Xestia badinosis (Grote, 1874)
- Xestia bolteri
- Xestia cinerascens (Smith, 1891)
- Xestia conchis
- Xestia dyris (Zerny, 1934) (tentatively placed here)
- Xestia finatimis Lafontaine, 1998
- Xestia fuscostigma (Bremer, 1861)
- Xestia lithoplana Hreblay & Ronkay 1998
- Xestia mejiasi Pinker, 1961
- Xestia normaniana – Norman's dart
- Xestia oblata (Morrison, 1875)
- Xestia substrigata (Smith, 1895)
- Xestia verniloides Lafontaine, 1998

=== Incertae sedis ===
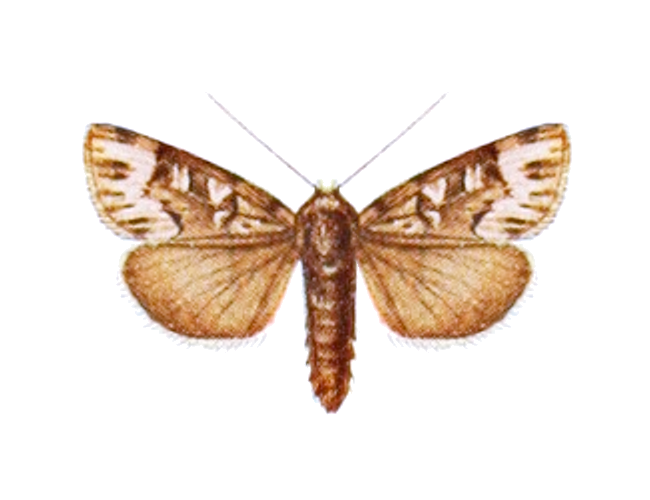
Xestia staudingeri, adult male

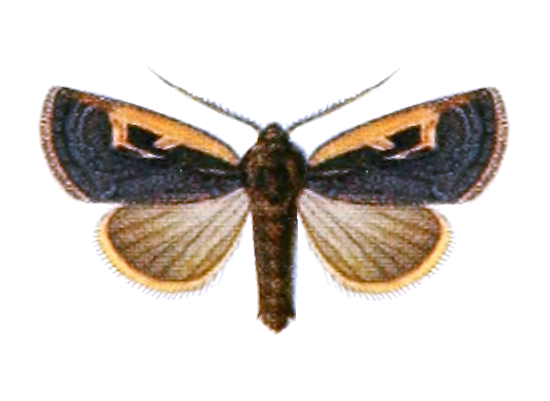
Xestia retracta, adult male

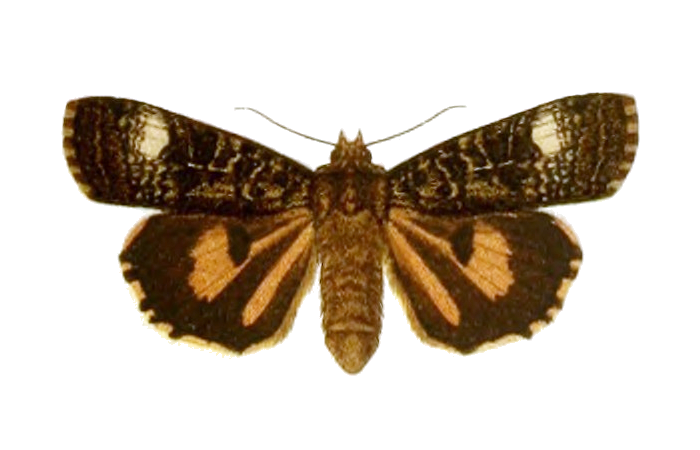
Xestia efflorescens, adult

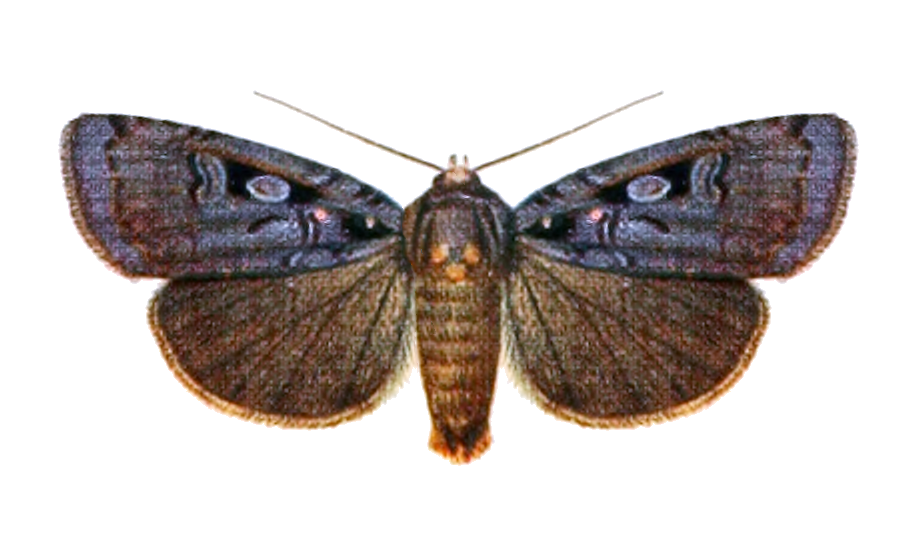
Xestia renalis, adult male

If the affiliations of the subgenera are not very much mistaken, most remaining cases of erroneous assignment to Xestia are to be found among the species of uncertain group affiliation here; for the recently described X. kecskerago for example it was explicitly stated that placement in the present genus is tentative. Other species of unclear affiliation are so little known that even their validity remains questionable, though this group equally well seems to contain quite distinct lineages of true Xestia. Also, there are some obvious species groups which do not easily fit into the subgeneric scheme above.

"Agrotiphila" group

- Xestia colorado (Smith, 1891) (type of Agrotiphila)
- Xestia maculata (Smith, 1893)
- Xestia staudingeri (type of Agrotimorpha)

"Hypoxestia" group

- Xestia dilatata (Butler, 1879) (type of Hypoxestia)

ornata group

- Xestia hypographa
- Xestia ornata (formerly in Eugraphe)

"Palaeamathes" group

- Xestia hoenei (Boursin, 1954) (type of Palaeamathes)

"Paramathes" group

- Xestia perigrapha (Püngeler, 1899) (type of Paramathes)

retracta/tenuis group

- Xestia basistriga Yoshimoto, 1995
- Xestia bifurcata Hreblay & Ronkay, 1998
- Xestia coronata Hacker & Peks, 1999
- Xestia destituta (Leech, 1900)
- Xestia forsteri Boursin, 1964
- Xestia hemitragidia (Boursin 1964)
- Xestia nyei Plante, 1979 (= X. longijuxta)
- Xestia retracta
- Xestia schaeferi Hreblay & Ronkay, 1998
- Xestia semiretracta Yoshimoto, 1995
- Xestia subforsteri Hreblay, & Ronkay 1998
- Xestia tenuis (Butler 1889)
- Xestia trifurcata Hacker & Peks, 1999

"Yellow hindwings" group

- Xestia bryocharis Boursin, 1948
- Xestia draesekei Boursin, 1948
- Xestia efflorescens
- Xestia flavilinea Wileman, 1912
- Xestia pseudoaccipiter Boursin, 1948
- Xestia semiherbida (Walker, 1857)
- Xestia sternecki Boursin, 1948
- Xestia triphaenoides Boursin, 1948

Species group unknown

- Xestia agalma (Püngeler, 1900)
- Xestia albifurca (Erschoff, [1877])
- Xestia cervina (Moore, 1867)
- Xestia consanguinea (Moore, 1881)
- Xestia costaestriga (Staudinger, 1895)
- Xestia crassipuncta (Wileman & West, 1928)
- Xestia homochroma (Hampson 1903)
- Xestia isochroma (Hampson 1903)
- Xestia isolata
- Xestia junctura (Moore, 1881)
- Xestia kecskerago Gyulai & L.Ronkay, 2006
- Xestia latinigra (Prout, 1928)
- Xestia mandarina (Leech, 1900)
- Xestia olivascens (Hampson, 1894)
- Xestia renalis
- Xestia rosifunda (Dyar, 1916)
- Xestia senescens (Staudinger, 1881) (formerly in Eugraphe)
- Xestia tamsi (Wileman & West, 1929)
- Xestia vidua (Staudinger, 1892)
- Xestia yamanei Chang, 1991
