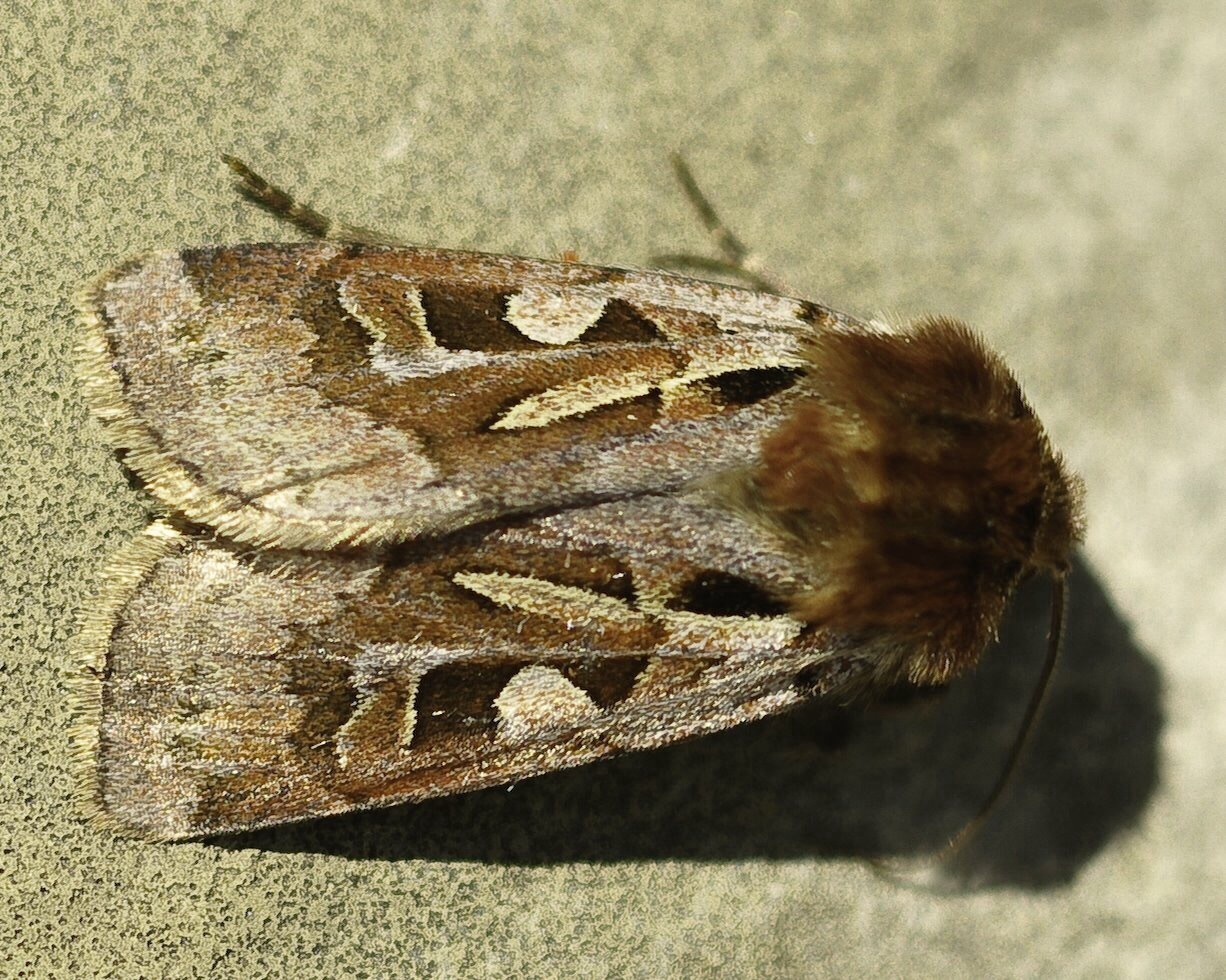

Scientific classification
- Domain: Eukaryota
- Kingdom: Animalia
- Phylum: Arthropoda
- Class: Insecta
- Order: Lepidoptera
- Superfamily: Noctuoidea
- Family: Noctuidae
- Tribe: Noctuini
- Subtribe: Noctuina
- Genus: Xestia
- Species: X. scropulana

Binomial name
- Xestia scropulana (Morrison, 1874)

= Xestia scropulana =

Species of moth

Xestia scropulana is a species of cutworm or dart moth in the family Noctuidae.
