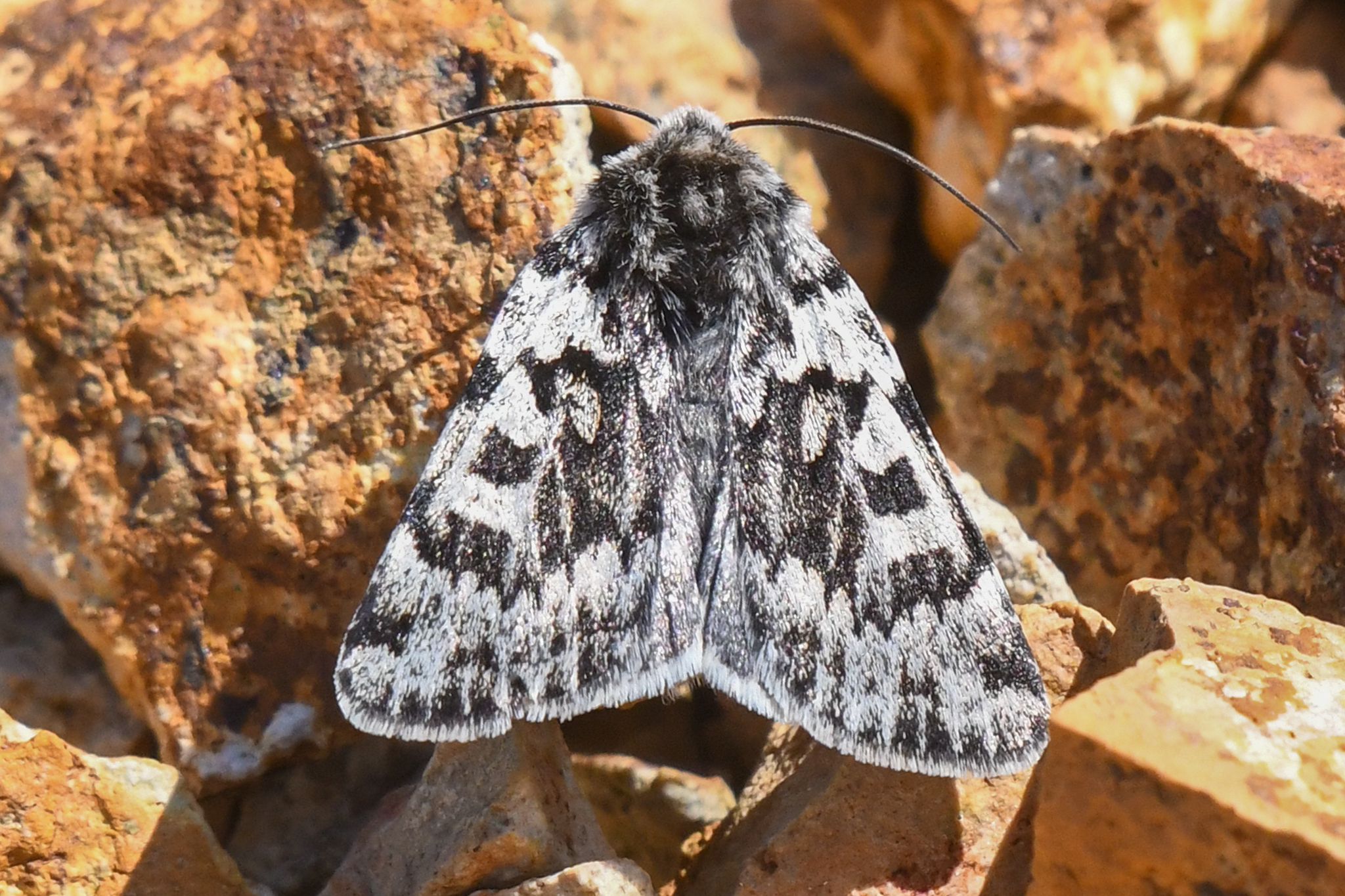

Scientific classification
- Domain: Eukaryota
- Kingdom: Animalia
- Phylum: Arthropoda
- Class: Insecta
- Order: Lepidoptera
- Superfamily: Noctuoidea
- Family: Noctuidae
- Genus: Xestia
- Species: X. maculata

Binomial name
- Xestia maculata (Smith, 1893)

Synonyms
- Agrotiphila maculata Smith, 1893; Agrotiphila maculate Smith, 1894

= Xestia maculata =

Species of moth

Xestia maculata is an owlet moth species found in North America, where it has been recorded from western Canada and Montana. It inhabits open alpine tundra.
