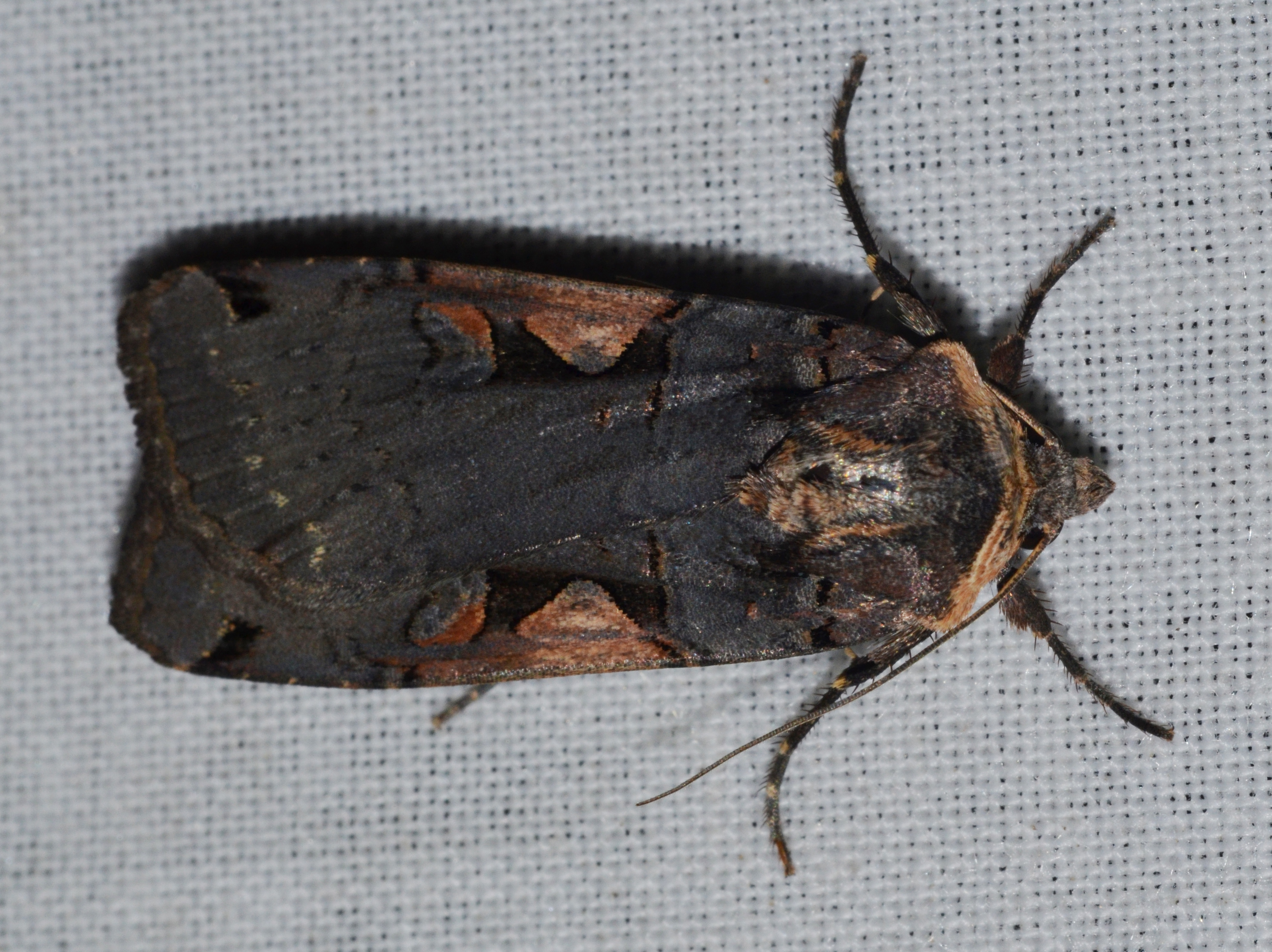

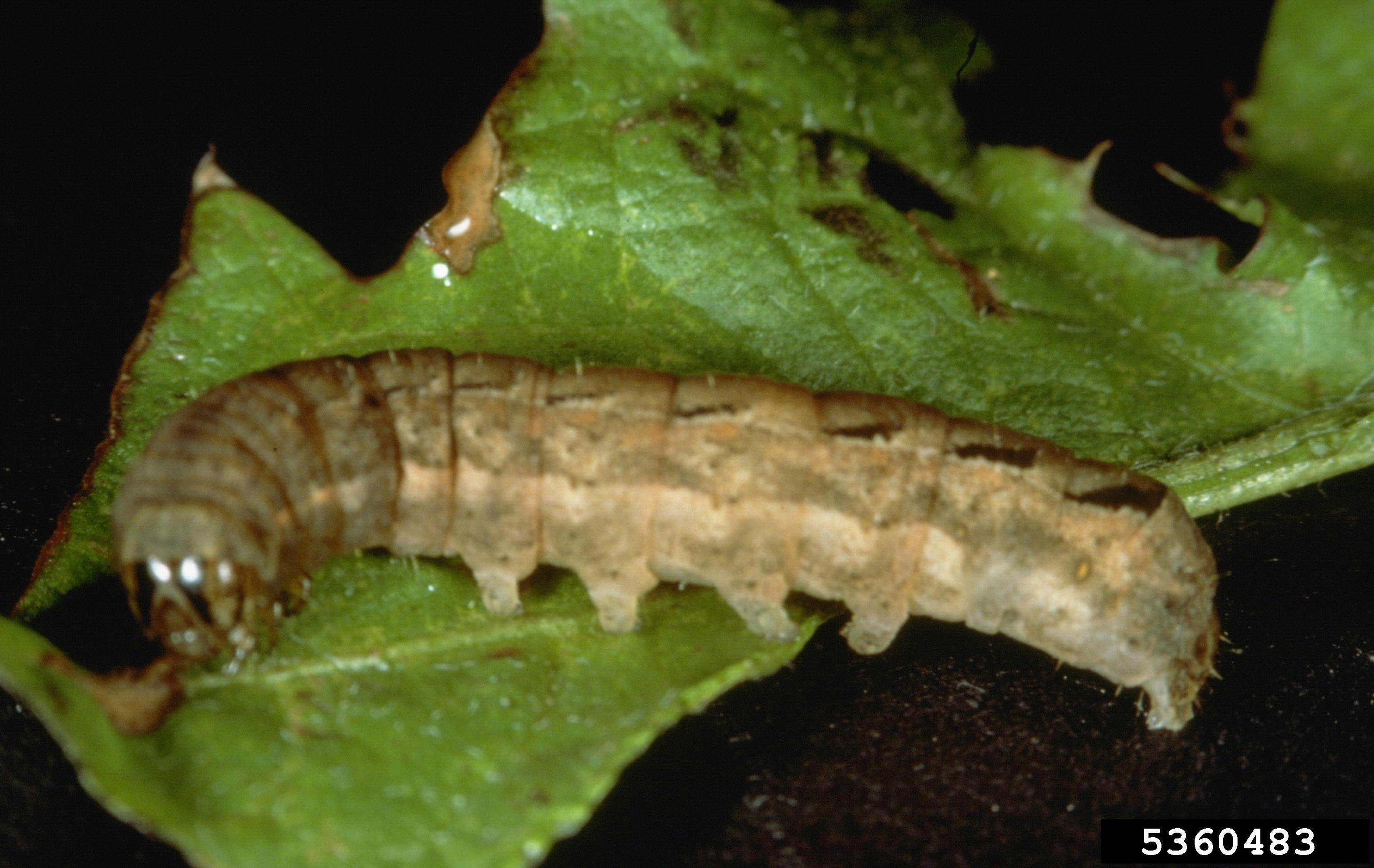

Scientific classification
- Kingdom: Animalia
- Phylum: Arthropoda
- Class: Insecta
- Order: Lepidoptera
- Superfamily: Noctuoidea
- Family: Noctuidae
- Genus: Xestia
- Species: X. dolosa

Binomial name
- Xestia dolosa Franclemont, 1980

= Xestia dolosa =

Species of moth

Xestia dolosa, known by the names greater black-letter dart, woodland spotted cutworm and spotted cutworm, is a moth of the family Noctuidae. (The common name spotted cutworm is also used for larvae of Xestia c-nigrum.) It is found in North America from the Canadian provinces of New Brunswick and Prince Edward Island to Florida, west to Texas, and north to North Dakota and Manitoba.

The wingspan is about 40 mm. The moth flies from May to October in two generations in the South and from July to August in one generation in the North.

The larva feeds on various crop plants, including barley, clovers, corn, and tobacco, as well as apples and maples.
