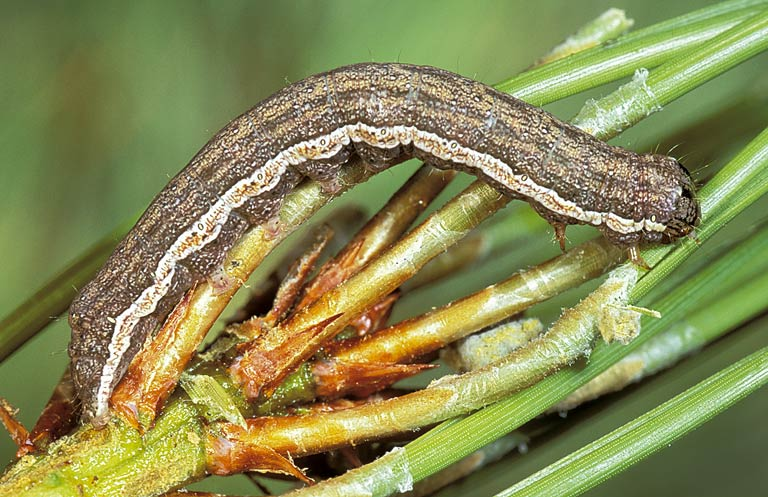

Scientific classification
- Domain: Eukaryota
- Kingdom: Animalia
- Phylum: Arthropoda
- Class: Insecta
- Order: Lepidoptera
- Superfamily: Noctuoidea
- Family: Noctuidae
- Genus: Xestia
- Species: X. praevia

Binomial name
- Xestia praevia Lafontaine, 1998

= Xestia praevia =

Species of moth

Xestia praevia is a moth of the family Noctuidae. It is found in Canada (New Brunswick, Quebec, Manitoba, Saskatchewan, Alberta and British Columbia) south to California. It is part of the elimata species group.

This wingspan is about 32 mm. The moth flies from July to August depending on the location.

The larva feeds on Pinus ponderosa.
