= Herbert Knowles Morrison =

American entomologist (1854–1885)

Herbert Knowles Morrison (January 24, 1854 – June 15, 1885) was an American entomologist and professional collector of insects. He was one of the founding members of the Cambridge Entomological Club, Massachusetts.

Morrison was born in Boston, the oldest child of William Albert and Mary Elizabeth (née Butler). He began to collect insects at the age of twelve and then began to take a special interest in the noctuid moths. From 1874, he began to collect and sell specimens for a living, making trips to remote areas. He collected in Colorado, Nevada, Washington, southern California, Arizona, Florida, and New Mexico. In 1885 while collecting in Key West, he was struck with dysentery and died, despite his fitness. He often walked forty miles a day collecting insects. He died in Morganton, North Carolina.

The Cambridge Entomological Club was formed in 1874 by amateur entomologists in the Boston area. They met in the home of H.A. Hagen, and the club was formed with thirteen members of whom Morrison was later made head of a committee on excursions.
