= List of Lepidoptera of Liechtenstein =

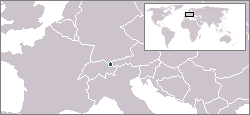
Location of Liechtenstein

The Lepidoptera of Liechtenstein consist of both the butterflies and moths recorded from Liechtenstein.

== Butterflies ==
=== Hesperiidae ===
- Carterocephalus palaemon (Pallas, 1771)
- Erynnis tages (Linnaeus, 1758)
- Hesperia comma (Linnaeus, 1758)
- Ochlodes sylvanus (Esper, 1777)
- Pyrgus alveus (Hübner, 1803)
- Pyrgus andromedae (Wallengren, 1853)
- Pyrgus cacaliae (Rambur, 1839)
- Pyrgus malvae (Linnaeus, 1758)
- Pyrgus malvoides (Elwes & Edwards, 1897)
- Pyrgus serratulae (Rambur, 1839)
- Spialia sertorius (Hoffmannsegg, 1804)
- Thymelicus lineola (Ochsenheimer, 1808)
- Thymelicus sylvestris (Poda, 1761)

=== Lycaenidae ===
- Agriades glandon (de Prunner, 1798)
- Agriades orbitulus (de Prunner, 1798)
- Aricia artaxerxes (Fabricius, 1793)
- Callophrys rubi (Linnaeus, 1758)
- Celastrina argiolus (Linnaeus, 1758)
- Cupido minimus (Fuessly, 1775)
- Cyaniris semiargus (Rottemburg, 1775)
- Eumedonia eumedon (Esper, 1780)
- Favonius quercus (Linnaeus, 1758)
- Glaucopsyche alexis (Poda, 1761)
- Lycaena hippothoe (Linnaeus, 1761)
- Lycaena tityrus (Poda, 1761)
- Lysandra bellargus (Rottemburg, 1775)
- Lysandra coridon (Poda, 1761)
- Phengaris alcon (Denis & Schiffermuller, 1775)
- Phengaris arion (Linnaeus, 1758)
- Phengaris nausithous (Bergstrasser, 1779)
- Phengaris teleius (Bergstrasser, 1779)
- Plebejus argus (Linnaeus, 1758)
- Plebejus idas (Linnaeus, 1761)
- Polyommatus damon (Denis & Schiffermuller, 1775)
- Polyommatus eros (Ochsenheimer, 1808)
- Polyommatus icarus (Rottemburg, 1775)
- Satyrium spini (Denis & Schiffermuller, 1775)
- Satyrium w-album (Knoch, 1782)
- Thecla betulae (Linnaeus, 1758)

=== Nymphalidae ===
- Aglais io (Linnaeus, 1758)
- Aglais urticae (Linnaeus, 1758)
- Apatura ilia (Denis & Schiffermuller, 1775)
- Apatura iris (Linnaeus, 1758)
- Aphantopus hyperantus (Linnaeus, 1758)
- Argynnis paphia (Linnaeus, 1758)
- Boloria napaea (Hoffmannsegg, 1804)
- Boloria pales (Denis & Schiffermuller, 1775)
- Boloria dia (Linnaeus, 1767)
- Boloria euphrosyne (Linnaeus, 1758)
- Boloria selene (Denis & Schiffermuller, 1775)
- Boloria thore (Hübner, 1803)
- Boloria titania (Esper, 1793)
- Brenthis ino (Rottemburg, 1775)
- Coenonympha arcania (Linnaeus, 1761)
- Coenonympha gardetta (de Prunner, 1798)
- Coenonympha glycerion (Borkhausen, 1788)
- Coenonympha oedippus (Fabricius, 1787)
- Coenonympha pamphilus (Linnaeus, 1758)
- Erebia aethiops (Esper, 1777)
- Erebia epiphron (Knoch, 1783)
- Erebia eriphyle (Freyer, 1836)
- Erebia euryale (Esper, 1805)
- Erebia gorge (Hübner, 1804)
- Erebia ligea (Linnaeus, 1758)
- Erebia manto (Denis & Schiffermuller, 1775)
- Erebia medusa (Denis & Schiffermuller, 1775)
- Erebia melampus (Fuessly, 1775)
- Erebia meolans (Prunner, 1798)
- Erebia mnestra (Hübner, 1804)
- Erebia montanus (de Prunner, 1798)
- Erebia oeme (Hübner, 1804)
- Erebia pandrose (Borkhausen, 1788)
- Erebia pharte (Hübner, 1804)
- Erebia pluto (de Prunner, 1798)
- Erebia pronoe (Esper, 1780)
- Erebia tyndarus (Esper, 1781)
- Euphydryas aurinia (Rottemburg, 1775)
- Euphydryas cynthia (Denis & Schiffermuller, 1775)
- Fabriciana adippe (Denis & Schiffermuller, 1775)
- Fabriciana niobe (Linnaeus, 1758)
- Issoria lathonia (Linnaeus, 1758)
- Lasiommata maera (Linnaeus, 1758)
- Lasiommata megera (Linnaeus, 1767)
- Lasiommata petropolitana (Fabricius, 1787)
- Limenitis camilla (Linnaeus, 1764)
- Maniola jurtina (Linnaeus, 1758)
- Melanargia galathea (Linnaeus, 1758)
- Melitaea athalia (Rottemburg, 1775)
- Melitaea aurelia Nickerl, 1850
- Melitaea didyma (Esper, 1778)
- Melitaea phoebe (Denis & Schiffermuller, 1775)
- Minois dryas (Scopoli, 1763)
- Nymphalis antiopa (Linnaeus, 1758)
- Nymphalis polychloros (Linnaeus, 1758)
- Oeneis glacialis (Moll, 1783)
- Pararge aegeria (Linnaeus, 1758)
- Polygonia c-album (Linnaeus, 1758)
- Speyeria aglaja (Linnaeus, 1758)
- Vanessa atalanta (Linnaeus, 1758)
- Vanessa cardui (Linnaeus, 1758)

=== Papilionidae ===
- Iphiclides podalirius (Linnaeus, 1758)
- Papilio machaon Linnaeus, 1758
- Parnassius apollo (Linnaeus, 1758)

=== Pieridae ===
- Anthocharis cardamines (Linnaeus, 1758)
- Aporia crataegi (Linnaeus, 1758)
- Colias alfacariensis Ribbe, 1905
- Colias hyale (Linnaeus, 1758)
- Colias palaeno (Linnaeus, 1761)
- Colias phicomone (Esper, 1780)
- Gonepteryx rhamni (Linnaeus, 1758)
- Leptidea sinapis (Linnaeus, 1758)
- Pieris brassicae (Linnaeus, 1758)
- Pieris bryoniae (Hübner, 1806)
- Pieris napi (Linnaeus, 1758)
- Pieris rapae (Linnaeus, 1758)
- Pontia callidice (Hübner, 1800)

=== Riodinidae ===
- Hamearis lucina (Linnaeus, 1758)

== Moths ==
=== Adelidae ===
- Nematopogon robertella (Clerck, 1759)

=== Argyresthiidae ===
- Argyresthia albistria (Haworth, 1828)
- Argyresthia goedartella (Linnaeus, 1758)
- Argyresthia pruniella (Clerck, 1759)
- Argyresthia retinella Zeller, 1839
- Argyresthia semitestacella (Curtis, 1833)

=== Autostichidae ===
- Deroxena venosulella (Moschler, 1862)

=== Bedelliidae ===
- Bedellia somnulentella (Zeller, 1847)

=== Coleophoridae ===
- Coleophora albidella (Denis & Schiffermuller, 1775)
- Coleophora alticolella Zeller, 1849
- Coleophora auricella (Fabricius, 1794)
- Coleophora caespititiella Zeller, 1839
- Coleophora discordella Zeller, 1849
- Coleophora frischella (Linnaeus, 1758)
- Coleophora laricella (Hübner, 1817)
- Coleophora lixella Zeller, 1849
- Coleophora mayrella (Hübner, 1813)
- Coleophora ornatipennella (Hübner, 1796)
- Coleophora striatipennella Nylander in Tengstrom, 1848
- Coleophora taeniipennella Herrich-Schäffer, 1855
- Coleophora versurella Zeller, 1849
- Coleophora wockeella Zeller, 1849

=== Cossidae ===
- Phragmataecia castaneae (Hübner, 1790)

=== Crambidae ===
- Agriphila straminella (Denis & Schiffermuller, 1775)
- Agriphila tristella (Denis & Schiffermuller, 1775)
- Anania crocealis (Hübner, 1796)
- Anania fuscalis (Denis & Schiffermuller, 1775)
- Anania hortulata (Linnaeus, 1758)
- Anania stachydalis (Germar, 1821)
- Catoptria falsella (Denis & Schiffermuller, 1775)
- Catoptria margaritella (Denis & Schiffermuller, 1775)
- Catoptria permutatellus (Herrich-Schäffer, 1848)
- Catoptria verellus (Zincken, 1817)
- Chilo phragmitella (Hübner, 1805)
- Chrysoteuchia culmella (Linnaeus, 1758)
- Crambus pascuella (Linnaeus, 1758)
- Crambus perlella (Scopoli, 1763)
- Crambus pratella (Linnaeus, 1758)
- Crambus silvella (Hübner, 1813)
- Crambus uliginosellus Zeller, 1850
- Diasemia reticularis (Linnaeus, 1761)
- Donacaula mucronella (Denis & Schiffermuller, 1775)
- Eudonia pallida (Curtis, 1827)
- Evergestis forficalis (Linnaeus, 1758)
- Evergestis pallidata (Hufnagel, 1767)
- Nomophila noctuella (Denis & Schiffermuller, 1775)
- Ostrinia nubilalis (Hübner, 1796)
- Paratalanta pandalis (Hübner, 1825)
- Platytes alpinella (Hübner, 1813)
- Pleuroptya ruralis (Scopoli, 1763)
- Pyrausta aurata (Scopoli, 1763)
- Pyrausta despicata (Scopoli, 1763)
- Pyrausta purpuralis (Linnaeus, 1758)
- Scoparia basistrigalis Knaggs, 1866
- Sitochroa palealis (Denis & Schiffermuller, 1775)
- Sitochroa verticalis (Linnaeus, 1758)
- Udea ferrugalis (Hübner, 1796)
- Udea olivalis (Denis & Schiffermuller, 1775)
- Udea prunalis (Denis & Schiffermuller, 1775)
- Xanthocrambus lucellus (Herrich-Schäffer, 1848)

=== Drepanidae ===
- Achlya flavicornis (Linnaeus, 1758)
- Drepana falcataria (Linnaeus, 1758)
- Habrosyne pyritoides (Hufnagel, 1766)
- Ochropacha duplaris (Linnaeus, 1761)
- Tethea or (Denis & Schiffermuller, 1775)
- Tetheella fluctuosa (Hübner, 1803)
- Thyatira batis (Linnaeus, 1758)
- Watsonalla binaria (Hufnagel, 1767)
- Watsonalla cultraria (Fabricius, 1775)

=== Elachistidae ===
- Agonopterix angelicella (Hübner, 1813)
- Agonopterix arenella (Denis & Schiffermuller, 1775)
- Agonopterix pallorella (Zeller, 1839)
- Elachista argentella (Clerck, 1759)
- Elachista subocellea (Stephens, 1834)
- Elachista alpinella Stainton, 1854
- Ethmia dodecea (Haworth, 1828)

=== Epermeniidae ===
- Epermenia illigerella (Hübner, 1813)

=== Erebidae ===
- Arctia caja (Linnaeus, 1758)
- Arctornis l-nigrum (Muller, 1764)
- Atolmis rubricollis (Linnaeus, 1758)
- Calliteara pudibunda (Linnaeus, 1758)
- Colobochyla salicalis (Denis & Schiffermuller, 1775)
- Cybosia mesomella (Linnaeus, 1758)
- Diacrisia sannio (Linnaeus, 1758)
- Eilema caniola (Hübner, 1808)
- Eilema depressa (Esper, 1787)
- Eilema griseola (Hübner, 1803)
- Eilema lurideola (Zincken, 1817)
- Euclidia mi (Clerck, 1759)
- Euproctis similis (Fuessly, 1775)
- Herminia grisealis (Denis & Schiffermuller, 1775)
- Herminia tarsicrinalis (Knoch, 1782)
- Herminia tarsipennalis (Treitschke, 1835)
- Hypena proboscidalis (Linnaeus, 1758)
- Hypenodes humidalis Doubleday, 1850
- Laspeyria flexula (Denis & Schiffermuller, 1775)
- Lymantria monacha (Linnaeus, 1758)
- Orgyia antiqua (Linnaeus, 1758)
- Pelosia muscerda (Hufnagel, 1766)
- Phragmatobia fuliginosa (Linnaeus, 1758)
- Phytometra viridaria (Clerck, 1759)
- Polypogon tentacularia (Linnaeus, 1758)
- Rhyparia purpurata (Linnaeus, 1758)
- Rivula sericealis (Scopoli, 1763)
- Scoliopteryx libatrix (Linnaeus, 1758)
- Spilosoma lubricipeda (Linnaeus, 1758)
- Thumatha senex (Hübner, 1808)

=== Gelechiidae ===
- Acompsia cinerella (Clerck, 1759)
- Athrips mouffetella (Linnaeus, 1758)
- Helcystogramma rufescens (Haworth, 1828)
- Monochroa lutulentella (Zeller, 1839)
- Recurvaria leucatella (Clerck, 1759)
- Sitotroga cerealella (Olivier, 1789)
- Thiotricha subocellea (Stephens, 1834)

=== Geometridae ===
- Abraxas sylvata (Scopoli, 1763)
- Acasis viretata (Hübner, 1799)
- Alcis bastelbergeri (Hirschke, 1908)
- Alcis repandata (Linnaeus, 1758)
- Angerona prunaria (Linnaeus, 1758)
- Anticollix sparsata (Treitschke, 1828)
- Apeira syringaria (Linnaeus, 1758)
- Aplocera praeformata (Hübner, 1826)
- Asthena anseraria (Herrich-Schäffer, 1855)
- Biston betularia (Linnaeus, 1758)
- Biston strataria (Hufnagel, 1767)
- Bupalus piniaria (Linnaeus, 1758)
- Cabera exanthemata (Scopoli, 1763)
- Cabera pusaria (Linnaeus, 1758)
- Campaea margaritaria (Linnaeus, 1761)
- Camptogramma bilineata (Linnaeus, 1758)
- Carsia sororiata (Hübner, 1813)
- Catarhoe cuculata (Hufnagel, 1767)
- Chariaspilates formosaria (Eversmann, 1837)
- Chiasmia clathrata (Linnaeus, 1758)
- Chlorissa viridata (Linnaeus, 1758)
- Chloroclysta siterata (Hufnagel, 1767)
- Chloroclystis v-ata (Haworth, 1809)
- Cleora cinctaria (Denis & Schiffermuller, 1775)
- Cleorodes lichenaria (Hufnagel, 1767)
- Colostygia olivata (Denis & Schiffermuller, 1775)
- Colostygia pectinataria (Knoch, 1781)
- Colotois pennaria (Linnaeus, 1761)
- Cosmorhoe ocellata (Linnaeus, 1758)
- Crocallis elinguaria (Linnaeus, 1758)
- Cyclophora linearia (Hübner, 1799)
- Cyclophora annularia (Fabricius, 1775)
- Deileptenia ribeata (Clerck, 1759)
- Dysstroma citrata (Linnaeus, 1761)
- Dysstroma truncata (Hufnagel, 1767)
- Ecliptopera silaceata (Denis & Schiffermuller, 1775)
- Ectropis crepuscularia (Denis & Schiffermuller, 1775)
- Electrophaes corylata (Thunberg, 1792)
- Elophos zelleraria (Freyer, 1836)
- Ematurga atomaria (Linnaeus, 1758)
- Ennomos erosaria (Denis & Schiffermuller, 1775)
- Entephria caesiata (Denis & Schiffermuller, 1775)
- Epione repandaria (Hufnagel, 1767)
- Epirrhoe alternata (Muller, 1764)
- Epirrhoe hastulata (Hübner, 1790)
- Epirrhoe tristata (Linnaeus, 1758)
- Eulithis testata (Linnaeus, 1761)
- Eupithecia absinthiata (Clerck, 1759)
- Eupithecia assimilata Doubleday, 1856
- Eupithecia distinctaria Herrich-Schäffer, 1848
- Eupithecia haworthiata Doubleday, 1856
- Eupithecia icterata (de Villers, 1789)
- Eupithecia intricata (Zetterstedt, 1839)
- Eupithecia plumbeolata (Haworth, 1809)
- Eupithecia pusillata (Denis & Schiffermuller, 1775)
- Eupithecia satyrata (Hübner, 1813)
- Eupithecia subfuscata (Haworth, 1809)
- Eupithecia subumbrata (Denis & Schiffermuller, 1775)
- Eupithecia tantillaria Boisduval, 1840
- Eupithecia tenuiata (Hübner, 1813)
- Eupithecia tripunctaria Herrich-Schäffer, 1852
- Eupithecia valerianata (Hübner, 1813)
- Eupithecia veratraria Herrich-Schäffer, 1848
- Gandaritis pyraliata (Denis & Schiffermuller, 1775)
- Gnophos furvata (Denis & Schiffermuller, 1775)
- Hemistola chrysoprasaria (Esper, 1795)
- Hemithea aestivaria (Hübner, 1789)
- Horisme radicaria (de La Harpe, 1855)
- Horisme vitalbata (Denis & Schiffermuller, 1775)
- Hydria cervinalis (Scopoli, 1763)
- Hydriomena furcata (Thunberg, 1784)
- Hylaea fasciaria (Linnaeus, 1758)
- Idaea aversata (Linnaeus, 1758)
- Idaea biselata (Hufnagel, 1767)
- Idaea dimidiata (Hufnagel, 1767)
- Idaea inquinata (Scopoli, 1763)
- Idaea muricata (Hufnagel, 1767)
- Ligdia adustata (Denis & Schiffermuller, 1775)
- Lobophora halterata (Hufnagel, 1767)
- Lomaspilis marginata (Linnaeus, 1758)
- Lomographa temerata (Denis & Schiffermuller, 1775)
- Lycia hirtaria (Clerck, 1759)
- Lycia zonaria (Denis & Schiffermuller, 1775)
- Macaria alternata (Denis & Schiffermuller, 1775)
- Macaria artesiaria (Denis & Schiffermuller, 1775)
- Macaria liturata (Clerck, 1759)
- Macaria signaria (Hübner, 1809)
- Melanthia procellata (Denis & Schiffermuller, 1775)
- Menophra abruptaria (Thunberg, 1792)
- Mesotype didymata (Linnaeus, 1758)
- Minoa murinata (Scopoli, 1763)
- Odezia atrata (Linnaeus, 1758)
- Opisthograptis luteolata (Linnaeus, 1758)
- Pareulype berberata (Denis & Schiffermuller, 1775)
- Pasiphila rectangulata (Linnaeus, 1758)
- Peribatodes rhomboidaria (Denis & Schiffermuller, 1775)
- Peribatodes secundaria (Denis & Schiffermuller, 1775)
- Perizoma albulata (Denis & Schiffermuller, 1775)
- Perizoma alchemillata (Linnaeus, 1758)
- Perizoma flavofasciata (Thunberg, 1792)
- Philereme vetulata (Denis & Schiffermuller, 1775)
- Plemyria rubiginata (Denis & Schiffermuller, 1775)
- Pterapherapteryx sexalata (Retzius, 1783)
- Pungeleria capreolaria (Denis & Schiffermuller, 1775)
- Scopula immutata (Linnaeus, 1758)
- Scopula caricaria (Reutti, 1853)
- Scopula immorata (Linnaeus, 1758)
- Scopula nemoraria (Hübner, 1799)
- Scopula nigropunctata (Hufnagel, 1767)
- Scopula ornata (Scopoli, 1763)
- Scotopteryx chenopodiata (Linnaeus, 1758)
- Selenia dentaria (Fabricius, 1775)
- Selenia tetralunaria (Hufnagel, 1767)
- Siona lineata (Scopoli, 1763)
- Thera britannica (Turner, 1925)
- Thera cognata (Thunberg, 1792)
- Thera variata (Denis & Schiffermuller, 1775)
- Thera vetustata (Denis & Schiffermuller, 1775)
- Theria primaria (Haworth, 1809)
- Timandra griseata Petersen, 1902
- Triphosa sabaudiata (Duponchel, 1830)
- Xanthorhoe designata (Hufnagel, 1767)
- Xanthorhoe ferrugata (Clerck, 1759)
- Xanthorhoe fluctuata (Linnaeus, 1758)
- Xanthorhoe montanata (Denis & Schiffermuller, 1775)
- Xanthorhoe quadrifasiata (Clerck, 1759)
- Xanthorhoe spadicearia (Denis & Schiffermuller, 1775)

=== Glyphipterigidae ===
- Acrolepiopsis assectella (Zeller, 1839)
- Glyphipterix thrasonella (Scopoli, 1763)
- Orthotelia sparganella (Thunberg, 1788)

=== Gracillariidae ===
- Aspilapteryx tringipennella (Zeller, 1839)
- Caloptilia stigmatella (Fabricius, 1781)
- Cameraria ohridella Deschka & Dimic, 1986
- Gracillaria syringella (Fabricius, 1794)
- Phyllonorycter platani (Staudinger, 1870)

=== Hepialidae ===
- Hepialus humuli (Linnaeus, 1758)
- Pharmacis fusconebulosa (DeGeer, 1778)
- Pharmacis lupulina (Linnaeus, 1758)
- Phymatopus hecta (Linnaeus, 1758)
- Triodia sylvina (Linnaeus, 1761)

=== Incurvariidae ===
- Incurvaria praelatella (Denis & Schiffermuller, 1775)

=== Lasiocampidae ===
- Dendrolimus pini (Linnaeus, 1758)
- Gastropacha quercifolia (Linnaeus, 1758)
- Lasiocampa quercus (Linnaeus, 1758)
- Lasiocampa trifolii (Denis & Schiffermuller, 1775)
- Macrothylacia rubi (Linnaeus, 1758)
- Malacosoma alpicola Staudinger, 1870
- Poecilocampa alpina (Frey & Wullschlegel, 1874)
- Poecilocampa populi (Linnaeus, 1758)
- Trichiura crataegi (Linnaeus, 1758)

=== Limacodidae ===
- Apoda limacodes (Hufnagel, 1766)

=== Micropterigidae ===
- Micropterix calthella (Linnaeus, 1761)

=== Noctuidae ===
- Abrostola triplasia (Linnaeus, 1758)
- Acronicta euphorbiae (Denis & Schiffermuller, 1775)
- Acronicta rumicis (Linnaeus, 1758)
- Actebia praecox (Linnaeus, 1758)
- Actinotia polyodon (Clerck, 1759)
- Agrochola helvola (Linnaeus, 1758)
- Agrochola litura (Linnaeus, 1758)
- Agrochola lota (Clerck, 1759)
- Agrochola macilenta (Hübner, 1809)
- Agrochola circellaris (Hufnagel, 1766)
- Agrotis exclamationis (Linnaeus, 1758)
- Agrotis ipsilon (Hufnagel, 1766)
- Agrotis segetum (Denis & Schiffermuller, 1775)
- Amphipoea fucosa (Freyer, 1830)
- Amphipoea oculea (Linnaeus, 1761)
- Amphipyra perflua (Fabricius, 1787)
- Amphipyra pyramidea (Linnaeus, 1758)
- Anaplectoides prasina (Denis & Schiffermuller, 1775)
- Anarta odontites (Boisduval, 1829)
- Anorthoa munda (Denis & Schiffermuller, 1775)
- Apamea crenata (Hufnagel, 1766)
- Apamea lithoxylaea (Denis & Schiffermuller, 1775)
- Apamea monoglypha (Hufnagel, 1766)
- Apamea remissa (Hübner, 1809)
- Apamea rubrirena (Treitschke, 1825)
- Apamea scolopacina (Esper, 1788)
- Apamea sordens (Hufnagel, 1766)
- Apamea sublustris (Esper, 1788)
- Apamea unanimis (Hübner, 1813)
- Apterogenum ypsillon (Denis & Schiffermuller, 1775)
- Archanara neurica (Hübner, 1808)
- Athetis gluteosa (Treitschke, 1835)
- Athetis pallustris (Hübner, 1808)
- Autographa bractea (Denis & Schiffermuller, 1775)
- Autographa gamma (Linnaeus, 1758)
- Autographa jota (Linnaeus, 1758)
- Autographa pulchrina (Haworth, 1809)
- Axylia putris (Linnaeus, 1761)
- Bryophila raptricula (Denis & Schiffermuller, 1775)
- Caradrina morpheus (Hufnagel, 1766)
- Caradrina clavipalpis Scopoli, 1763
- Ceramica pisi (Linnaeus, 1758)
- Cerastis leucographa (Denis & Schiffermuller, 1775)
- Cerastis rubricosa (Denis & Schiffermuller, 1775)
- Charanyca trigrammica (Hufnagel, 1766)
- Charanyca ferruginea (Esper, 1785)
- Chilodes maritima (Tauscher, 1806)
- Chloantha hyperici (Denis & Schiffermuller, 1775)
- Conistra vaccinii (Linnaeus, 1761)
- Conistra rubiginea (Denis & Schiffermuller, 1775)
- Cosmia trapezina (Linnaeus, 1758)
- Cosmia pyralina (Denis & Schiffermuller, 1775)
- Craniophora ligustri (Denis & Schiffermuller, 1775)
- Cucullia lucifuga (Denis & Schiffermuller, 1775)
- Cucullia umbratica (Linnaeus, 1758)
- Deltote bankiana (Fabricius, 1775)
- Deltote deceptoria (Scopoli, 1763)
- Deltote uncula (Clerck, 1759)
- Deltote pygarga (Hufnagel, 1766)
- Denticucullus pygmina (Haworth, 1809)
- Diachrysia chrysitis (Linnaeus, 1758)
- Diachrysia chryson (Esper, 1789)
- Diachrysia nadeja (Oberthur, 1880)
- Diarsia brunnea (Denis & Schiffermuller, 1775)
- Diarsia mendica (Fabricius, 1775)
- Diarsia rubi (Vieweg, 1790)
- Elaphria venustula (Hübner, 1790)
- Eucarta amethystina (Hübner, 1803)
- Euplexia lucipara (Linnaeus, 1758)
- Eupsilia transversa (Hufnagel, 1766)
- Euxoa decora (Denis & Schiffermuller, 1775)
- Gortyna flavago (Denis & Schiffermuller, 1775)
- Graphiphora augur (Fabricius, 1775)
- Griposia aprilina (Linnaeus, 1758)
- Hadena perplexa (Denis & Schiffermuller, 1775)
- Hadena confusa (Hufnagel, 1766)
- Heliothis peltigera (Denis & Schiffermuller, 1775)
- Helotropha leucostigma (Hübner, 1808)
- Hoplodrina ambigua (Denis & Schiffermuller, 1775)
- Hoplodrina blanda (Denis & Schiffermuller, 1775)
- Hoplodrina octogenaria (Goeze, 1781)
- Hoplodrina superstes (Ochsenheimer, 1816)
- Hydraecia micacea (Esper, 1789)
- Ipimorpha retusa (Linnaeus, 1761)
- Ipimorpha subtusa (Denis & Schiffermuller, 1775)
- Lacanobia contigua (Denis & Schiffermuller, 1775)
- Lacanobia suasa (Denis & Schiffermuller, 1775)
- Lacanobia thalassina (Hufnagel, 1766)
- Lacanobia oleracea (Linnaeus, 1758)
- Lacanobia splendens (Hübner, 1808)
- Lacanobia w-latinum (Hufnagel, 1766)
- Lateroligia ophiogramma (Esper, 1794)
- Leucania comma (Linnaeus, 1761)
- Lithophane consocia (Borkhausen, 1792)
- Lithophane ornitopus (Hufnagel, 1766)
- Lithophane socia (Hufnagel, 1766)
- Macdunnoughia confusa (Stephens, 1850)
- Mamestra brassicae (Linnaeus, 1758)
- Melanchra persicariae (Linnaeus, 1761)
- Mesapamea secalis (Linnaeus, 1758)
- Mesogona oxalina (Hübner, 1803)
- Mesoligia furuncula (Denis & Schiffermuller, 1775)
- Mniotype adusta (Esper, 1790)
- Mniotype satura (Denis & Schiffermuller, 1775)
- Mormo maura (Linnaeus, 1758)
- Mythimna albipuncta (Denis & Schiffermuller, 1775)
- Mythimna ferrago (Fabricius, 1787)
- Mythimna l-album (Linnaeus, 1767)
- Mythimna conigera (Denis & Schiffermuller, 1775)
- Mythimna impura (Hübner, 1808)
- Mythimna pudorina (Denis & Schiffermuller, 1775)
- Mythimna straminea (Treitschke, 1825)
- Mythimna turca (Linnaeus, 1761)
- Noctua comes Hübner, 1813
- Noctua fimbriata (Schreber, 1759)
- Noctua interjecta Hübner, 1803
- Noctua janthina Denis & Schiffermuller, 1775
- Noctua pronuba (Linnaeus, 1758)
- Ochropleura plecta (Linnaeus, 1761)
- Oligia latruncula (Denis & Schiffermuller, 1775)
- Oligia strigilis (Linnaeus, 1758)
- Oligia versicolor (Borkhausen, 1792)
- Orthosia gracilis (Denis & Schiffermuller, 1775)
- Orthosia cerasi (Fabricius, 1775)
- Orthosia cruda (Denis & Schiffermuller, 1775)
- Orthosia incerta (Hufnagel, 1766)
- Orthosia gothica (Linnaeus, 1758)
- Pachetra sagittigera (Hufnagel, 1766)
- Panthea coenobita (Esper, 1785)
- Paradiarsia punicea (Hübner, 1803)
- Peridroma saucia (Hübner, 1808)
- Phlogophora meticulosa (Linnaeus, 1758)
- Photedes minima (Haworth, 1809)
- Plusia festucae (Linnaeus, 1758)
- Polia bombycina (Hufnagel, 1766)
- Polia nebulosa (Hufnagel, 1766)
- Polymixis xanthomista (Hübner, 1819)
- Pyrrhia umbra (Hufnagel, 1766)
- Rhizedra lutosa (Hübner, 1803)
- Sideridis rivularis (Fabricius, 1775)
- Tholera decimalis (Poda, 1761)
- Tiliacea aurago (Denis & Schiffermuller, 1775)
- Trachea atriplicis (Linnaeus, 1758)
- Trichoplusia ni (Hübner, 1803)
- Xanthia icteritia (Hufnagel, 1766)
- Xanthia togata (Esper, 1788)
- Xestia ashworthii (Doubleday, 1855)
- Xestia c-nigrum (Linnaeus, 1758)
- Xestia ditrapezium (Denis & Schiffermuller, 1775)
- Xestia triangulum (Hufnagel, 1766)
- Xestia baja (Denis & Schiffermuller, 1775)
- Xestia sexstrigata (Haworth, 1809)
- Xestia stigmatica (Hübner, 1813)
- Xestia xanthographa (Denis & Schiffermuller, 1775)
- Xylena vetusta (Hübner, 1813)

=== Nolidae ===
- Earias clorana (Linnaeus, 1761)
- Nola aerugula (Hübner, 1793)
- Nola cucullatella (Linnaeus, 1758)

=== Notodontidae ===
- Cerura vinula (Linnaeus, 1758)
- Clostera anachoreta (Denis & Schiffermuller, 1775)
- Clostera curtula (Linnaeus, 1758)
- Clostera pigra (Hufnagel, 1766)
- Drymonia dodonaea (Denis & Schiffermuller, 1775)
- Drymonia obliterata (Esper, 1785)
- Drymonia querna (Denis & Schiffermuller, 1775)
- Drymonia ruficornis (Hufnagel, 1766)
- Furcula furcula (Clerck, 1759)
- Gluphisia crenata (Esper, 1785)
- Harpyia milhauseri (Fabricius, 1775)
- Notodonta dromedarius (Linnaeus, 1767)
- Notodonta ziczac (Linnaeus, 1758)
- Odontosia carmelita (Esper, 1799)
- Peridea anceps (Goeze, 1781)
- Phalera bucephala (Linnaeus, 1758)
- Pheosia gnoma (Fabricius, 1776)
- Pheosia tremula (Clerck, 1759)
- Pterostoma palpina (Clerck, 1759)
- Ptilodon capucina (Linnaeus, 1758)
- Ptilodon cucullina (Denis & Schiffermuller, 1775)
- Ptilophora plumigera (Denis & Schiffermuller, 1775)
- Stauropus fagi (Linnaeus, 1758)

=== Oecophoridae ===
- Bisigna procerella (Denis & Schiffermuller, 1775)
- Crassa unitella (Hübner, 1796)

=== Peleopodidae ===
- Carcina quercana (Fabricius, 1775)

=== Plutellidae ===
- Plutella xylostella (Linnaeus, 1758)

=== Praydidae ===
- Prays fraxinella (Bjerkander, 1784)

=== Psychidae ===
- Bacotia claustrella (Bruand, 1845)
- Dahlica triquetrella (Hübner, 1813)
- Epichnopterix plumella (Denis & Schiffermuller, 1775)
- Taleporia tubulosa (Retzius, 1783)

=== Pterophoridae ===
- Adaina microdactyla (Hübner, 1813)
- Capperia celeusi (Frey, 1886)
- Crombrugghia tristis (Zeller, 1841)
- Emmelina monodactyla (Linnaeus, 1758)
- Hellinsia inulae (Zeller, 1852)
- Platyptilia isodactylus (Zeller, 1852)
- Pterophorus pentadactyla (Linnaeus, 1758)

=== Pyralidae ===
- Achroia grisella (Fabricius, 1794)
- Acrobasis advenella (Zincken, 1818)
- Anerastia lotella (Hübner, 1813)
- Dioryctria abietella (Denis & Schiffermuller, 1775)
- Hypochalcia ahenella (Denis & Schiffermuller, 1775)
- Hypsopygia costalis (Fabricius, 1775)
- Oncocera semirubella (Scopoli, 1763)
- Phycita roborella (Denis & Schiffermuller, 1775)
- Phycitodes albatella (Ragonot, 1887)
- Phycitodes binaevella (Hübner, 1813)
- Phycitodes inquinatella (Ragonot, 1887)
- Pyralis farinalis (Linnaeus, 1758)

=== Saturniidae ===
- Saturnia pavonia (Linnaeus, 1758)

=== Sesiidae ===
- Bembecia ichneumoniformis (Denis & Schiffermuller, 1775)
- Chamaesphecia empiformis (Esper, 1783)
- Paranthrene tabaniformis (Rottemburg, 1775)
- Pennisetia hylaeiformis (Laspeyres, 1801)
- Sesia apiformis (Clerck, 1759)
- Sesia bembeciformis (Hübner, 1806)
- Sesia melanocephala Dalman, 1816
- Synanthedon andrenaeformis (Laspeyres, 1801)
- Synanthedon cephiformis (Ochsenheimer, 1808)
- Synanthedon formicaeformis (Esper, 1783)
- Synanthedon myopaeformis (Borkhausen, 1789)
- Synanthedon soffneri Spatenka, 1983
- Synanthedon spheciformis (Denis & Schiffermuller, 1775)
- Synanthedon spuleri (Fuchs, 1908)
- Synanthedon vespiformis (Linnaeus, 1761)

=== Sphingidae ===
- Acherontia atropos (Linnaeus, 1758)
- Agrius convolvuli (Linnaeus, 1758)
- Deilephila elpenor (Linnaeus, 1758)
- Deilephila porcellus (Linnaeus, 1758)
- Hemaris fuciformis (Linnaeus, 1758)
- Hemaris tityus (Linnaeus, 1758)
- Hyles euphorbiae (Linnaeus, 1758)
- Hyles gallii (Rottemburg, 1775)
- Laothoe populi (Linnaeus, 1758)
- Macroglossum stellatarum (Linnaeus, 1758)
- Mimas tiliae (Linnaeus, 1758)
- Smerinthus ocellata (Linnaeus, 1758)
- Sphinx ligustri Linnaeus, 1758
- Sphinx pinastri Linnaeus, 1758

=== Stathmopodidae ===
- Stathmopoda pedella (Linnaeus, 1761)

=== Tortricidae ===
- Acleris aspersana (Hübner, 1817)
- Acleris effractana (Hübner, 1799)
- Acleris emargana (Fabricius, 1775)
- Acleris forsskaleana (Linnaeus, 1758)
- Acleris lorquiniana (Duponchel, 1835)
- Acleris sparsana (Denis & Schiffermuller, 1775)
- Aethes hartmanniana (Clerck, 1759)
- Aethes rubigana (Treitschke, 1830)
- Agapeta zoegana (Linnaeus, 1767)
- Ancylis apicella (Denis & Schiffermuller, 1775)
- Ancylis obtusana (Haworth, 1811)
- Ancylis unculana (Haworth, 1811)
- Aphelia viburniana (Denis & Schiffermuller, 1775)
- Aphelia paleana (Hübner, 1793)
- Apotomis betuletana (Haworth, 1811)
- Apotomis capreana (Hübner, 1817)
- Apotomis semifasciana (Haworth, 1811)
- Archips oporana (Linnaeus, 1758)
- Archips podana (Scopoli, 1763)
- Archips rosana (Linnaeus, 1758)
- Archips xylosteana (Linnaeus, 1758)
- Bactra lancealana (Hübner, 1799)
- Celypha aurofasciana (Haworth, 1811)
- Celypha doubledayana (Barrett, 1872)
- Celypha lacunana (Denis & Schiffermuller, 1775)
- Celypha rivulana (Scopoli, 1763)
- Celypha rufana (Scopoli, 1763)
- Celypha striana (Denis & Schiffermuller, 1775)
- Cnephasia alticolana (Herrich-Schäffer, 1851)
- Cnephasia asseclana (Denis & Schiffermuller, 1775)
- Cnephasia pasiuana (Hübner, 1799)
- Cnephasia incertana (Treitschke, 1835)
- Cochylidia subroseana (Haworth, 1811)
- Cydia fagiglandana (Zeller, 1841)
- Cydia pomonella (Linnaeus, 1758)
- Cydia splendana (Hübner, 1799)
- Dichelia histrionana (Frolich, 1828)
- Dichrorampha simpliciana (Haworth, 1811)
- Eana osseana (Scopoli, 1763)
- Endothenia ericetana (Humphreys & Westwood, 1845)
- Endothenia gentianaeana (Hübner, 1799)
- Endothenia quadrimaculana (Haworth, 1811)
- Epiblema graphana (Treitschke, 1835)
- Epinotia granitana (Herrich-Schäffer, 1851)
- Epinotia nanana (Treitschke, 1835)
- Epinotia ramella (Linnaeus, 1758)
- Epinotia solandriana (Linnaeus, 1758)
- Epinotia tedella (Clerck, 1759)
- Epinotia tenerana (Denis & Schiffermuller, 1775)
- Epinotia trigonella (Linnaeus, 1758)
- Eucosma campoliliana (Denis & Schiffermuller, 1775)
- Eupoecilia sanguisorbana (Herrich-Schäffer, 1856)
- Falseuncaria ruficiliana (Haworth, 1811)
- Gynnidomorpha alismana (Ragonot, 1883)
- Gypsonoma dealbana (Frolich, 1828)
- Hedya nubiferana (Haworth, 1811)
- Hedya pruniana (Hübner, 1799)
- Lathronympha strigana (Fabricius, 1775)
- Lepteucosma huebneriana Kocak, 1980
- Neosphaleroptera nubilana (Hübner, 1799)
- Notocelia cynosbatella (Linnaeus, 1758)
- Notocelia uddmanniana (Linnaeus, 1758)
- Olindia schumacherana (Fabricius, 1787)
- Orthotaenia undulana (Denis & Schiffermuller, 1775)
- Pammene fasciana (Linnaeus, 1761)
- Pammene ochsenheimeriana (Lienig & Zeller, 1846)
- Pandemis cerasana (Hübner, 1786)
- Pandemis cinnamomeana (Treitschke, 1830)
- Pandemis corylana (Fabricius, 1794)
- Pandemis dumetana (Treitschke, 1835)
- Pandemis heparana (Denis & Schiffermuller, 1775)
- Phiaris micana (Denis & Schiffermuller, 1775)
- Phtheochroa inopiana (Haworth, 1811)
- Pseudargyrotoza conwagana (Fabricius, 1775)
- Pseudococcyx turionella (Linnaeus, 1758)
- Pseudosciaphila branderiana (Linnaeus, 1758)
- Ptycholomoides aeriferana (Herrich-Schäffer, 1851)
- Rhopobota naevana (Hübner, 1817)
- Sparganothis pilleriana (Denis & Schiffermuller, 1775)
- Spilonota laricana (Heinemann, 1863)
- Tortrix viridana Linnaeus, 1758
- Zeiraphera griseana (Hübner, 1799)
- Zeiraphera isertana (Fabricius, 1794)

=== Yponomeutidae ===
- Yponomeuta evonymella (Linnaeus, 1758)
- Yponomeuta padella (Linnaeus, 1758)
- Yponomeuta plumbella (Denis & Schiffermuller, 1775)

=== Ypsolophidae ===
- Ypsolopha dentella (Fabricius, 1775)
- Ypsolopha ustella (Clerck, 1759)

=== Zygaenidae ===
- Adscita geryon (Hübner, 1813)
- Adscita statices (Linnaeus, 1758)
- Zygaena purpuralis (Brunnich, 1763)
- Zygaena filipendulae (Linnaeus, 1758)
- Zygaena lonicerae (Scheven, 1777)
- Zygaena loti (Denis & Schiffermuller, 1775)
- Zygaena osterodensis Reiss, 1921
- Zygaena transalpina (Esper, 1780)
- Zygaena trifolii (Esper, 1783)
- Zygaena viciae (Denis & Schiffermuller, 1775)
