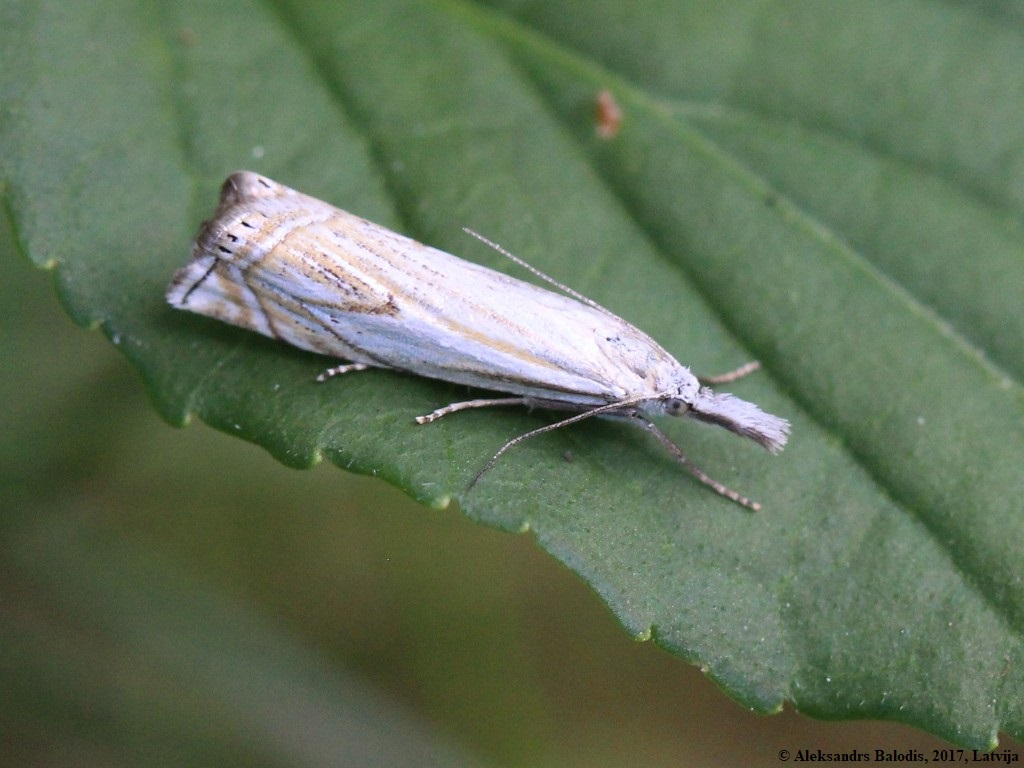

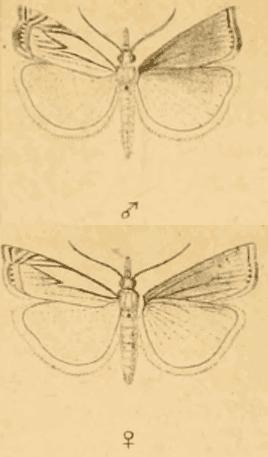

Scientific classification
- Kingdom: Animalia
- Phylum: Arthropoda
- Clade: Pancrustacea
- Class: Insecta
- Order: Lepidoptera
- Family: Crambidae
- Genus: Crambus
- Species: C. uliginosellus

Binomial name
- Crambus uliginosellus Zeller, 1850

Synonyms
- Crambus uliginosellus f. infuscatellus Caradja, 1910

= Crambus uliginosellus =

Species of moth

Crambus uliginosellus is a species of moth in the family Crambidae. It was first described by Zeller in 1850 and is currently found in most of Europe, except Portugal, Slovenia, Croatia and Ukraine.

The wingspan is 18–23 mm. The forewings with apex slightly produced; yellow-ochreous, posteriorly with whitish interneural streaks edged with dark fuscous; a suffused white dorsal streak; a broad white median longitudinal streak, edged with dark fuscous, reaching costa until near middle, cut by an oblique dark brown line beyond middle, and usually by an ochreous subcostal line; second line angulated, silvery-white, preceded and followed by triangular white costal spots; some black terminal dots; cilia metallic. Hindwings are whitish, towards apex suffused with grey. See also Parsons et al.
