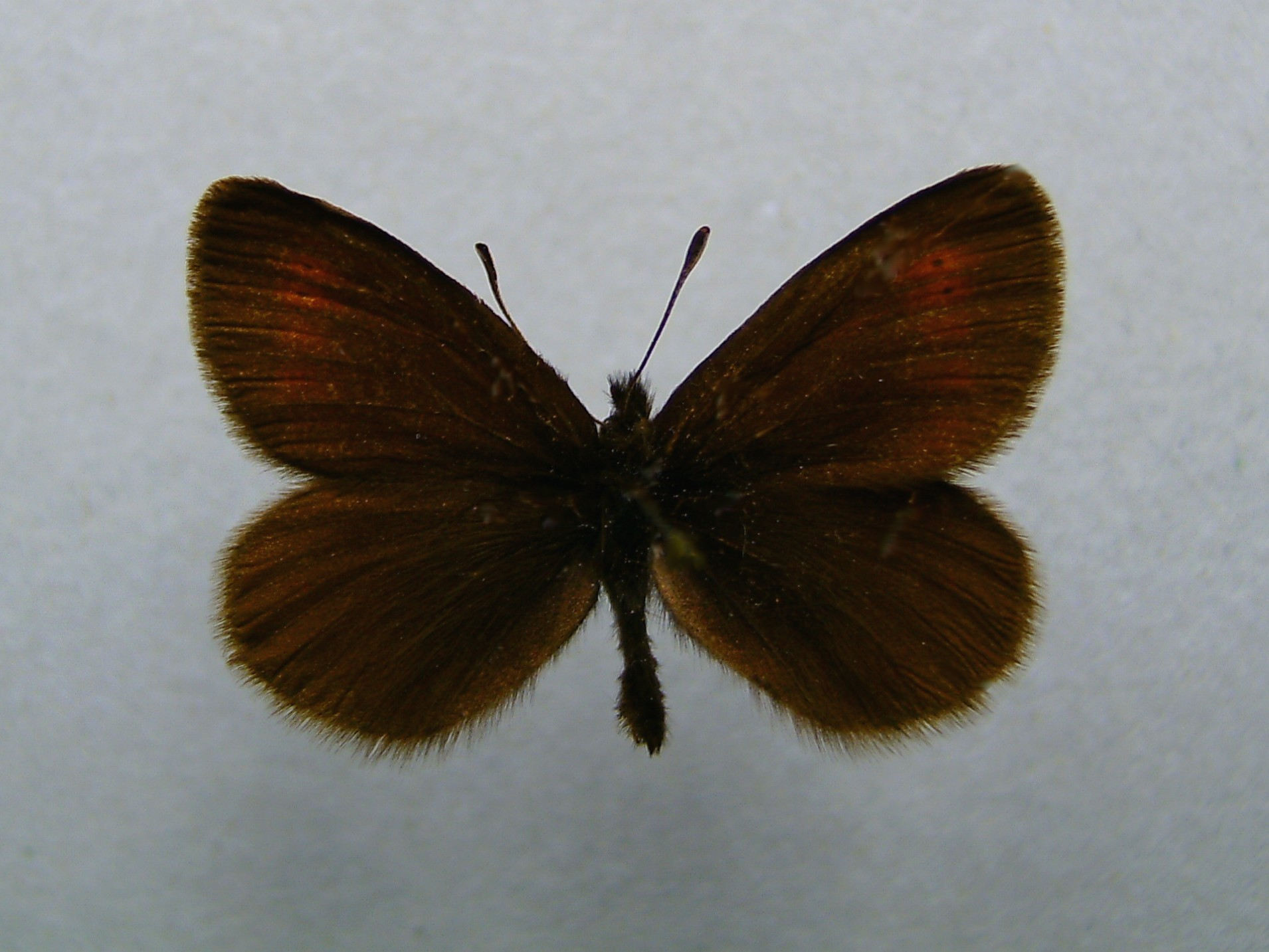

Scientific classification
- Kingdom: Animalia
- Phylum: Arthropoda
- Clade: Pancrustacea
- Class: Insecta
- Order: Lepidoptera
- Family: Nymphalidae
- Genus: Erebia
- Species: E. eriphyle

Binomial name
- Erebia eriphyle (Freyer 1836)

= Eriphyle ringlet =

Species of butterfly

The Eriphyle ringlet (Erebia eriphyle) is a member of the subfamily Satyrinae of family Nymphalidae. It is a high mountain butterfly found in the Alps.Wheeler (1903) gives a short description

== Description in Seitz ==
E. eriphyle Frr. (36 c). This Erebia which is very close to melampus was formerly considered to be only a variety of the latter, but is constantly different. The distal band of the forewing is more or less reddish brown, sometimes brown-yellow, being separated by the veins into several elongate, distally rounded spots. The number of these spots is variable, there being usually 5, sometimes only 3-4. The 2 spots placed close to the outer margin bear small black dots. On the hindwing there are 3 - 4 red-brown or brownish spots of which the one near the median vein in cellule 4 is placed a little more basad, being always larger and more elongate, while in melampusi it is never larger than the other spots of the hindwing. The shape and position of this spot and the absence of black centres are the main characters of eriphyle, which moreover is distinctly larger than melampus. Beneath the band of the forewing is lighter than above, being ochre-yellow in many specimens; the spots of the hindwing are of the same colour, being much more prominent than above. In the female the ground-colour paler, the underside yellowish brown, band and spots less distinct than in the male. The distal margin of the male somewhat paler than the ground, brownish grey in the female. Antenna black-brown above, white-grey beneath. — An inhabitant of the Alps, prefers limestone, and occurs in July and August at altitudes of from 900 to 2200 m. — ab. impunctata Hofn. differs in the spots of both wings being larger and in the band of the forewing bearing no black dots. — In ab. tristis H.Schiff., from Graubunden and the Alps of Schwyz, the marginal band of the forewing is brighter in colour and the disc of the hindwing beneath has a reddish flush. — ab. intermedia Frey, from Carinthia, has more distinct reddish yellow spots, also on the hindwing.
