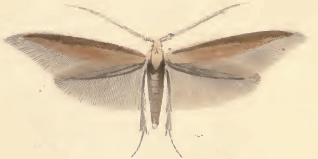

Scientific classification
- Kingdom: Animalia
- Phylum: Arthropoda
- Class: Insecta
- Order: Lepidoptera
- Family: Coleophoridae
- Genus: Coleophora
- Species: C. wockeella

Binomial name
- Coleophora wockeella Zeller, 1849

Synonyms
- Coleophora italiae Toll, 1960

= Coleophora wockeella =

Species of moth

Coleophora wockeella is a moth of the family Coleophoridae. It is found from Latvia to the Iberian Peninsula, Italy and Albania and from Great Britain to southern Russia.

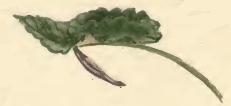
Mined leaf of Betonica officinalis with a larva-case attached

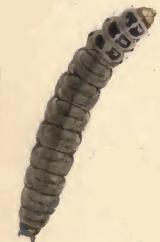
Larva

The wingspan is about 20 mm. Adults are on wing from June to July in western Europe.

The larvae feed on betony (Stachys officinalis). Larvae can be found from autumn to mid-May.

== Etymology ==
The species was named after the German entomologist Maximilian Ferdinand Wocke.
