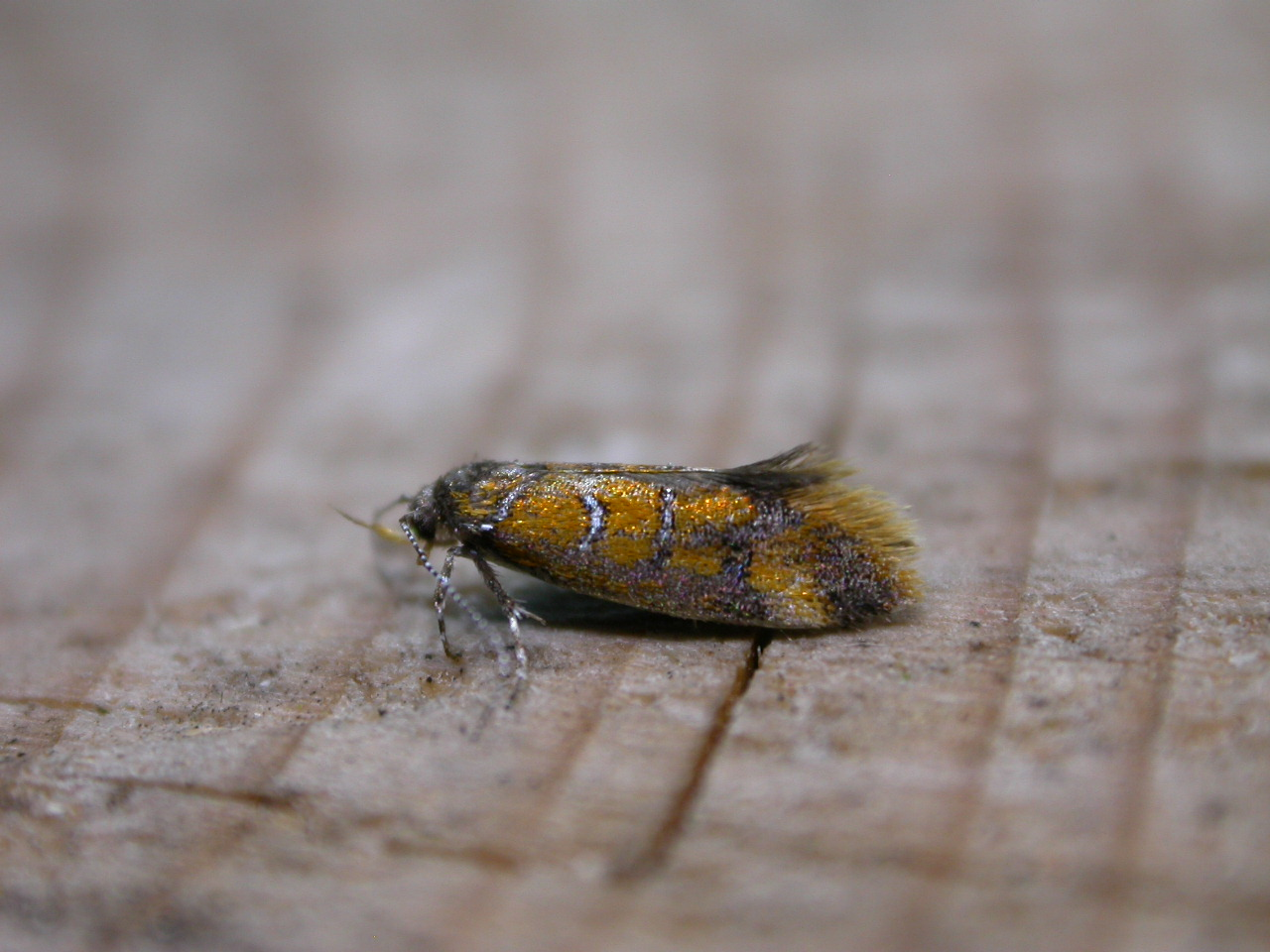

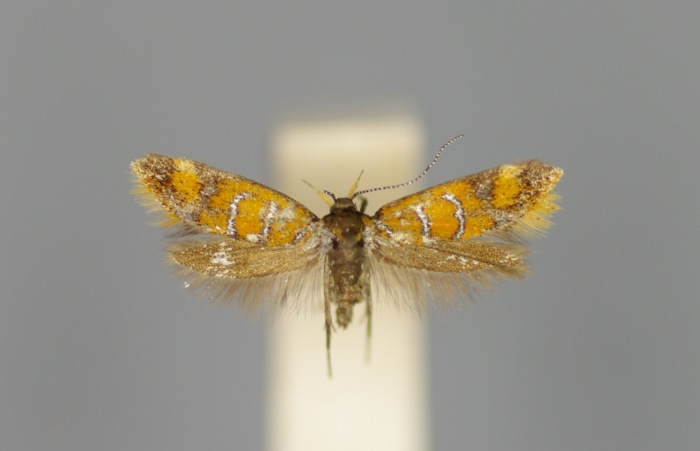

Scientific classification
- Kingdom: Animalia
- Phylum: Arthropoda
- Class: Insecta
- Order: Lepidoptera
- Family: Oecophoridae
- Genus: Bisigna
- Species: B. procerella

Binomial name
- Bisigna procerella (Denis & Schiffermüller, 1775)

Synonyms
- Tinea procerella Denis & Schiffermüller, 1775; Promalactis procerella (Denis & Schiffermüller, 1775); Promalactis atriplagata Park & Park, 1998

= Bisigna procerella =

Species of moth

Bisigna procerella is a moth of the family Oecophoridae. It is found in Europe.

The wingspan is 11–13 mm. The moth flies from June to August depending on the location.

The larvae feed on lichens on tree-trunks.
