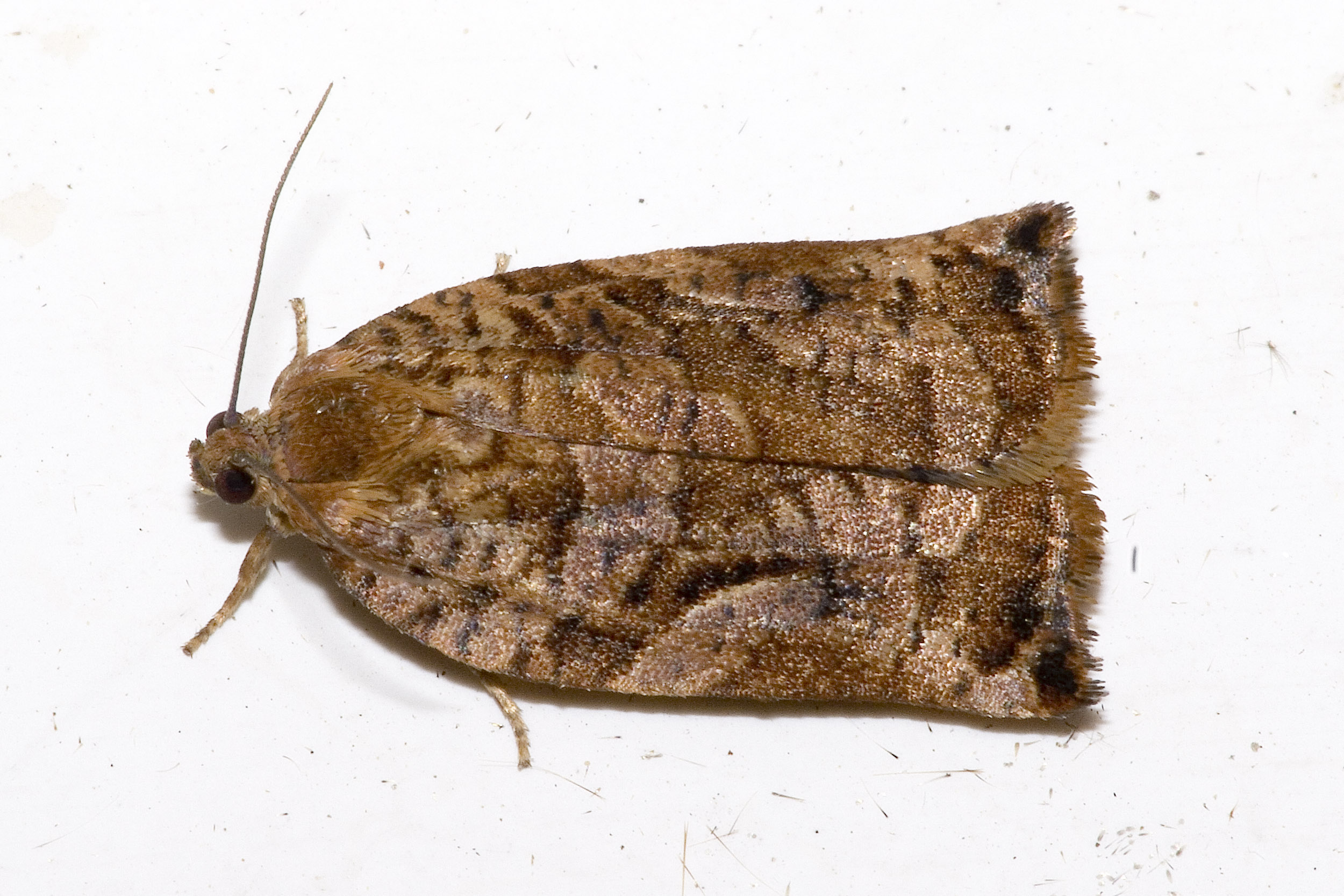

Scientific classification
- Kingdom: Animalia
- Phylum: Arthropoda
- Clade: Pancrustacea
- Class: Insecta
- Order: Lepidoptera
- Family: Tortricidae
- Genus: Archips
- Species: A. oporana

Binomial name
- Archips oporana (Linnaeus, 1758)

Synonyms
- List: Phalaena (Tortrix) oporana Linnaeus, 1758; Cacoecia bathyglypta Meyrick, in Caradja, 1932; Lozotaenia dissimilana Bentley, 1845; Tortrix hermanniana [Denis & Schiffermuller], 1775; Cacoecia impervia Meyrick, in de Joannis, 1930; Phalaena (Tortrix) piceana Linnaeus, 1758; Archippus (Archippus) pieceanus Yasuda, 1975; Cacoecia similis Butler, 1879

= Archips oporana =

Species of moth

Archips oporana, also known as the pine tortrix or spruce tortrix, is a moth of the family Tortricidae, found in Asia and Europe. It was first described by Carl Linnaeus in 1758.

== Description ==
The wingspan is 19–28 millimetres (0.75–1.10 in). In western Europe the moth flies from late May to July, and there is a partial second generation in August and September.

The larvae initially feed in September tying two sets of needles and attach it to the branch of the host plant. They overwinter in a silken tube among the needles. The following year, the larva eat new shoots and may bore into the stem, which can cause them to shrivel and break off. On juniper the larva spins a thick white web amongst the leaves. Pupation is in the larval habitation in June and July. Larva can be found on silver fir (Abies alba), European larch (Larix decidua), common juniper (Juniperus communis), spruce (Picea species), Scots pine (Pinus sylvestris) and cedars (Thuja species).

== Distribution ==
The moth is found in most of Europe and in Asia it is found in China (Heilongjiang, Liaoning), Korea, Japan and Russia (Primorye).
