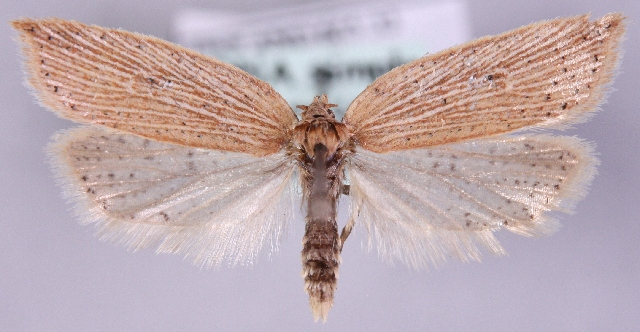

Scientific classification
- Kingdom: Animalia
- Phylum: Arthropoda
- Clade: Pancrustacea
- Class: Insecta
- Order: Lepidoptera
- Family: Tortricidae
- Genus: Acleris
- Species: A. lorquiniana

Binomial name
- Acleris lorquiniana (Duponchel, in Godart, 1835)

Synonyms
- Peronea lorquiniana Duponchel, in Godart, 1835; atrosignana Herrich-Schaffer, 1849; Tortrix (Teras) atrosignana Herrich-Schaffer, 1851; Dictyopteryx lorquiniana f. flavana Sheldon, 1931; Teras striatana Ragonot, 1894; Bactra uliginosana Humphreys & Westwood, 1845

= Acleris lorquiniana =

Species of moth

Acleris lorquiniana, the marsh button, is a species of moth of the family Tortricidae. It is found in Iran and central and northern Europe, where it has been recorded from Great Britain, France, Belgium, the Netherlands, Germany, Denmark, Austria, Switzerland, the Czech Republic, Slovakia, Poland, Romania, Hungary, Sweden, Finland, the Baltic region and Russia. The habitat consists of damp fenland.

The wingspan is 15–20 mm. Adults are on wing from June to July and again from September to October in two generations per year.

The larvae feed on Lythrum salicaria. They feed on the shoots, flowers and seeds of their host plant.
