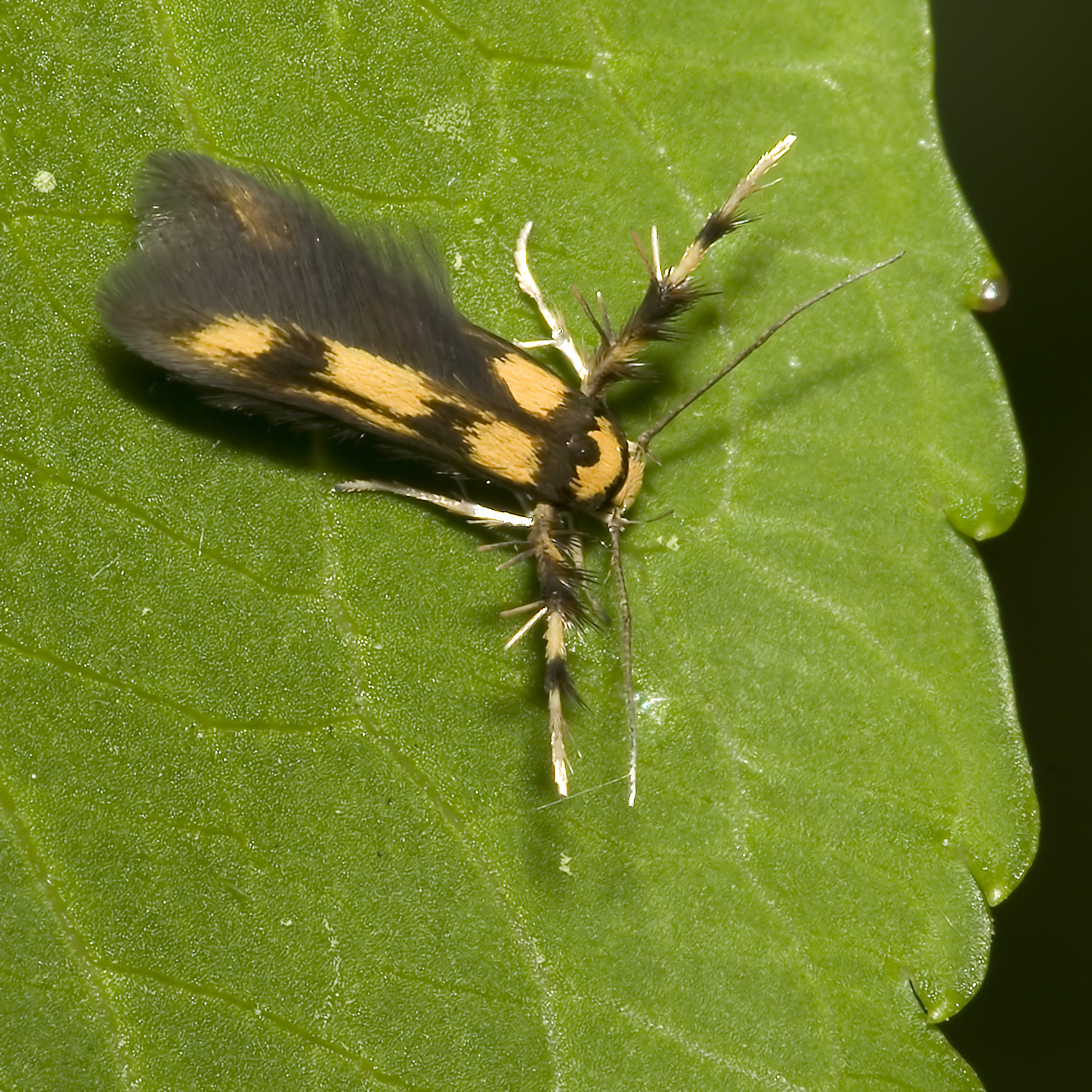

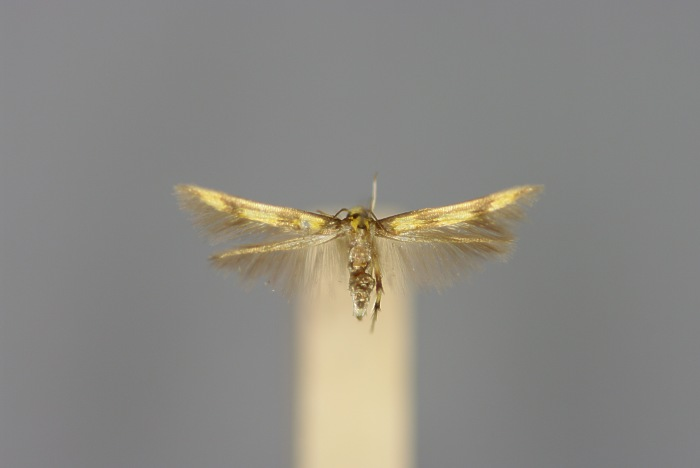

Scientific classification
- Kingdom: Animalia
- Phylum: Arthropoda
- Class: Insecta
- Order: Lepidoptera
- Family: Stathmopodidae
- Genus: Stathmopoda
- Species: S. pedella

Binomial name
- Stathmopoda pedella Linnaeus, 1761

= Stathmopoda pedella =

Species of moth

Stathmopoda pedella is a species of moth of the family Stathmopodidae. It is found in Europe.

The wingspan is 10–14 mm. The moth flies in July depending on the location.

The larvae feed on the seeds of ripening fruits of the alder.
