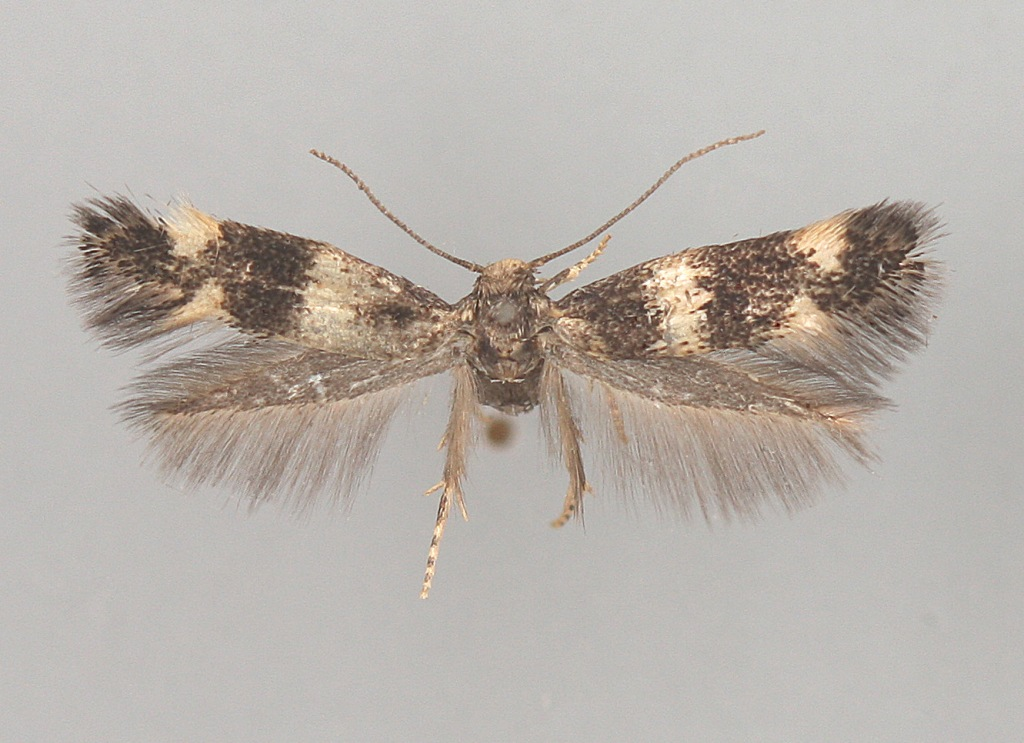

Scientific classification
- Domain: Eukaryota
- Kingdom: Animalia
- Phylum: Arthropoda
- Class: Insecta
- Order: Lepidoptera
- Family: Elachistidae
- Genus: Elachista
- Species: E. alpinella

Binomial name
- Elachista alpinella Stainton, 1854

Synonyms
- Elachista monticola Wocke in Heinemann, 1876; Elachista oxytypa Braun, 1948

= Elachista alpinella =

Species of moth

Elachista alpinella is a moth of the family Elachistidae found in Europe and North America.

== Description ==
The wingspan is 9–13 millimetres (0.35–0.51 in) The head is fuscous, whitish-sprinkled. Forewings are dark fuscous, basal area in female sometimes pale; a somewhat curved fascia before middle, in male obsolete towards costa, an erect triangular tornal spot, and a similar spot on costa beyond it white, in female larger. Hindwings are dark grey.

The moth flies from June through to September.

The larvae feed on acute sedge (Carex acuta), lesser pond-sedge (Carex acutiformis), greater tussock-sedge (Carex paniculata) and greater pond sedge (Carex riparia), mining the leaves of their host.

== Distribution ==
It is found from Fennoscandia and northern Russia to the Pyrenees and Italy and from Ireland to central Russia and Hungary. It is also found in North America.
