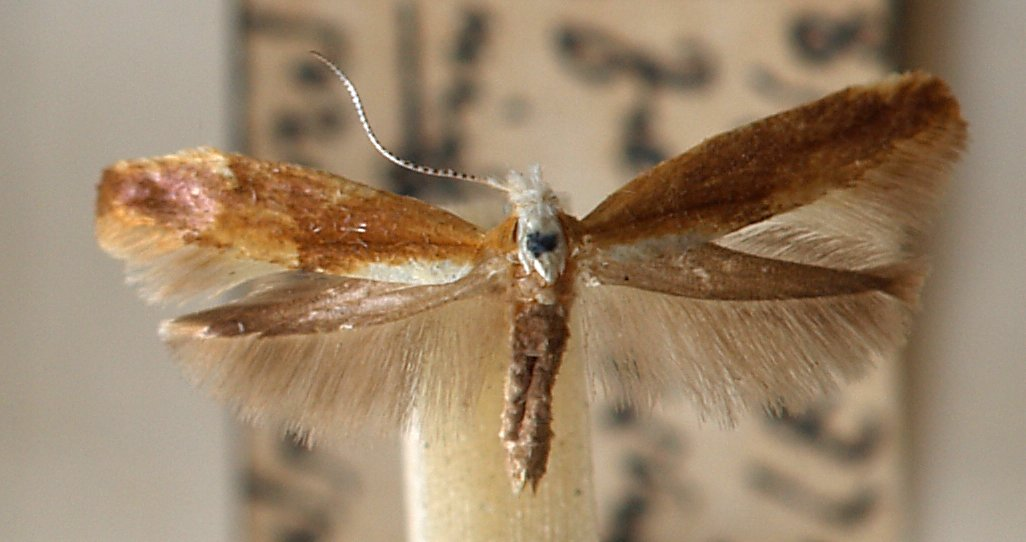

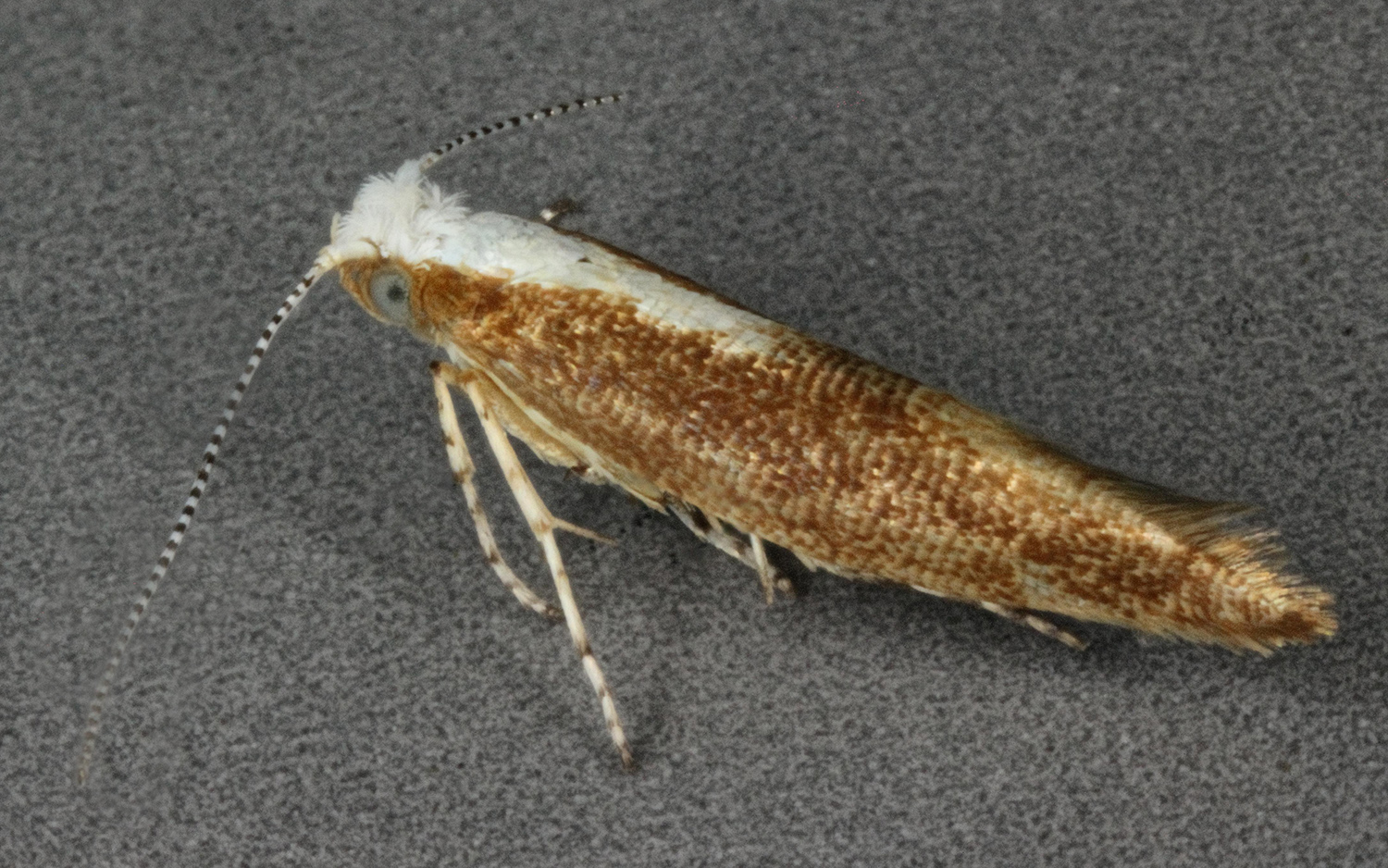

Scientific classification
- Kingdom: Animalia
- Phylum: Arthropoda
- Clade: Pancrustacea
- Class: Insecta
- Order: Lepidoptera
- Family: Argyresthiidae
- Genus: Argyresthia
- Species: A. albistria

Binomial name
- Argyresthia albistria (Haworth, 1828)

Synonyms
- Erminea albistria Haworth, 1828; Argyresthia fagetella Zeller, 1839

= Argyresthia albistria =

Species of moth

Argyresthia albistria is a moth of the family Yponomeutidae. It is found in most of Europe.

The wingspan is 9–12 mm. The head is white. Forewings are ferruginous-brown, purplish-tinged; a white dorsal streak to tornus, interrupted by a dark ferruginous -brown quadrate median spot. Hindwings are grey. The larva is pale green; a red band on each segment; head and plate of 2 black.

The moth flies at night from June to August and is attracted to light.

The larvae feed on blackthorn (Prunus spinosa), overwintering and feeding in the spring.
