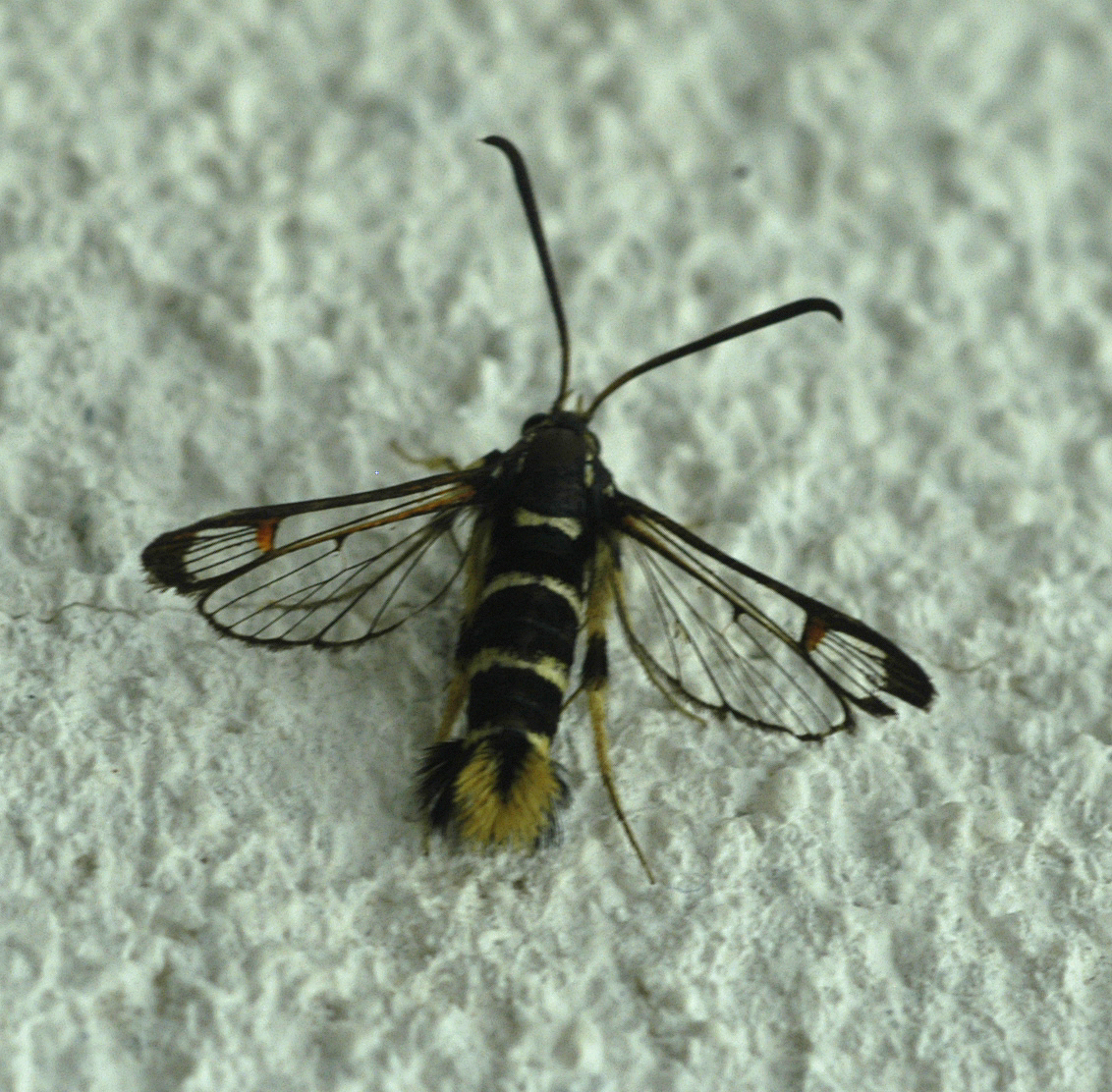

Scientific classification
- Kingdom: Animalia
- Phylum: Arthropoda
- Clade: Pancrustacea
- Class: Insecta
- Order: Lepidoptera
- Family: Sesiidae
- Genus: Synanthedon
- Species: S. vespiformis

Binomial name
- Synanthedon vespiformis (Linnaeus, 1761)

Synonyms
- Sphinx vespiformis Linnaeus, 1761; Sphinx asiliformis Rottemburg, 1775 (nec Denis & Schiffermüller, 1775); Sphinx oestriformis Rottemburg, 1775; Sphinx cynipiformis Esper, 1783; Sphinx chrysorrhoea Donovan, 1795; Synanthedon vespiformis var. hadjina Le Cerf, 1920; Synanthedon vespiformis var. polycincta Dalla Torre & Strand, 1925; Synanthedon vespiformis f. quadriannulata Schnaider, 1942; Synanthedon vespiformis f. rufimarginata Schnaider, 1942; Trochilium vespiformis ab. rufimarginata Spuler, 1910; Synanthedon vespiformis ab. polycincta Le Cerf, 1922

= Synanthedon vespiformis =

Yellow-legged clearwing

Species of moth

Synanthedon vespiformis, the yellow-legged clearwing, is a moth of the family Sesiidae. It is found in the Palearctic realm.

The wingspan is 18–20 mm. The moth flies from April to September depending on the location.

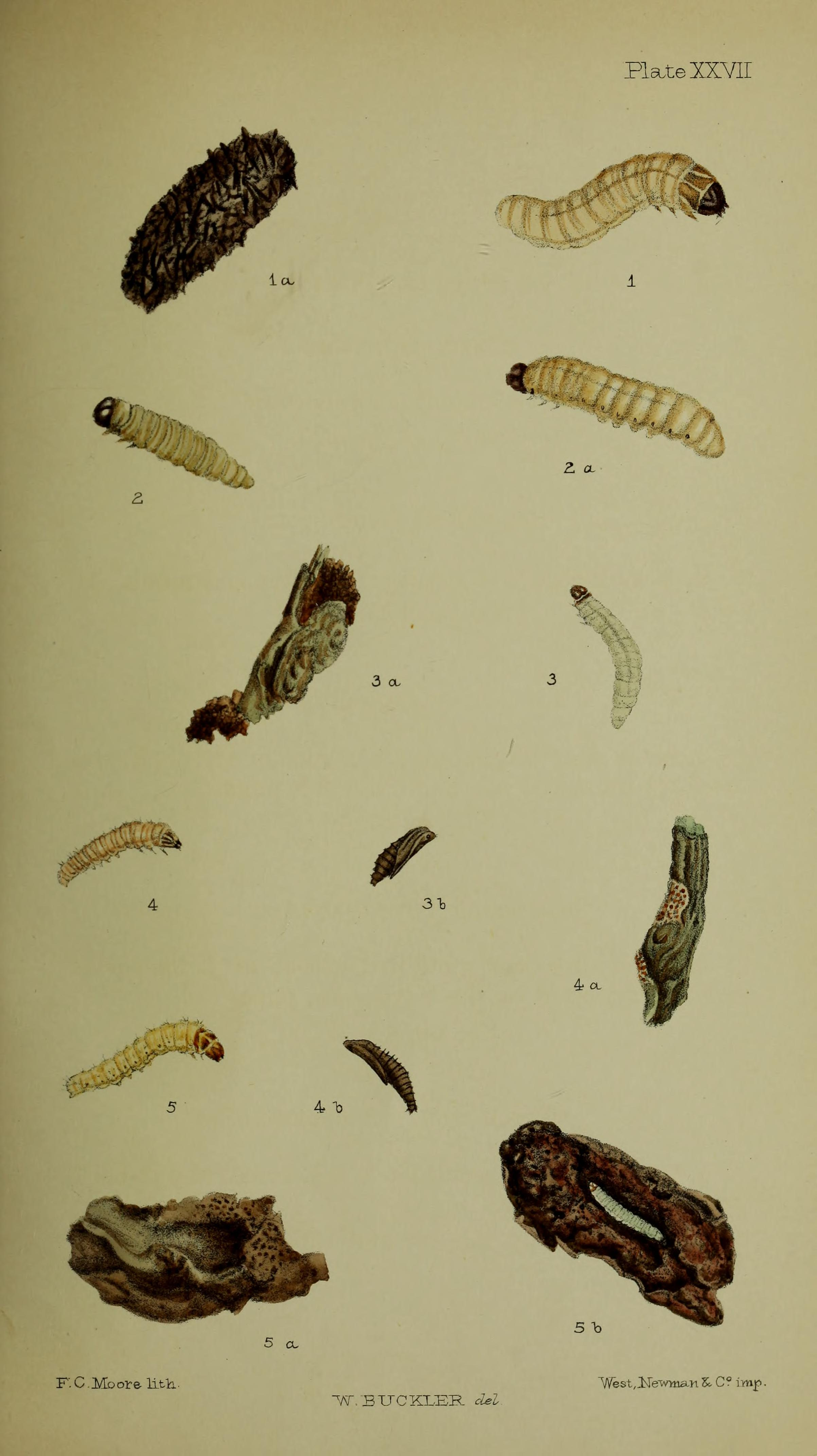
Figs. 5 larvae after last moult 5a, 5b pieces of oak (Quercus) bark ravaged by the larva

The larvae feed on oak, but also species from the genera Populus, Aesculus and Salix.
