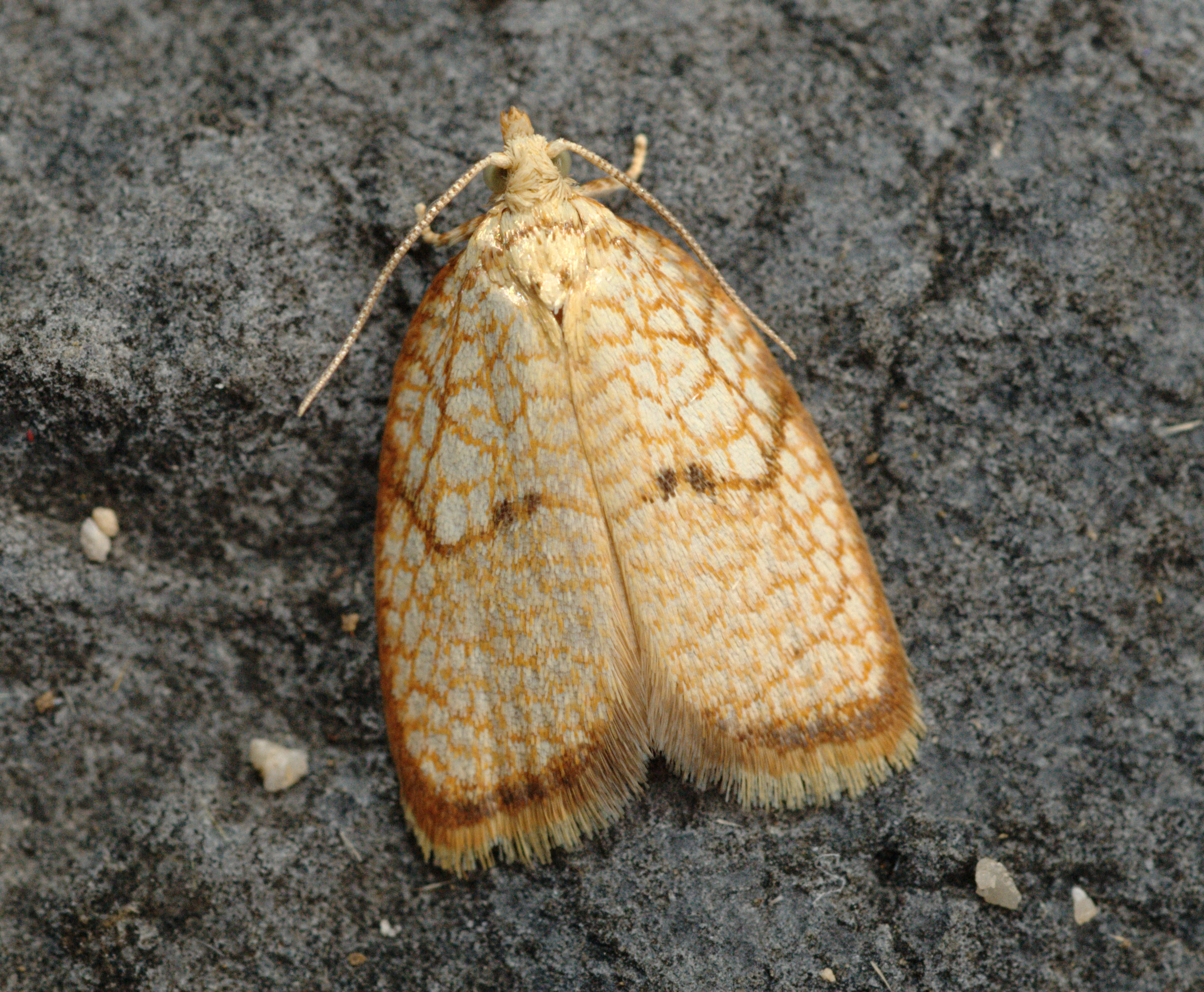

Scientific classification
- Kingdom: Animalia
- Phylum: Arthropoda
- Class: Insecta
- Order: Lepidoptera
- Family: Tortricidae
- Genus: Acleris
- Species: A. forsskaleana

Binomial name
- Acleris forsskaleana (Linnaeus, 1758)

Synonyms
- Phalaena (Tortrix) forsskaleana Linnaeus, 1758; Tortrix agraphana Klemensiewicz, 1904; Tortrix folskaleana Kennel, 1910; Tortrix forcaleana Kuznetzov, 1960; Tortrix forscaeleana Warneburg, 1864; Tortrix forskaeleana Zincken, in Charpentier, 1821; Pyralis forskahleana Fabricius, 1775; Pyralis forskahliana Fabricius, 1781; Phalaena forskaleana Clerck, 1759; Rhacodia forskaleana Hubner, [1825] 1816; Tortrix forskaliana Haworth, [1811]; Tortrix forskoleana Hubner, [1796-1799]; Tortrix forskoliana [Denis & Schiffermuller], 1775

= Acleris forsskaleana =

Species of moth

Acleris forsskaleana, the maple leaftier moth, is a moth of the family Tortricidae. It is found in Europe and North America in woodlands and gardens.

The wingspan is 12–17 mm. The ground colour of the forewings is yellowish underlying a reticulated darker pattern and a greyish suffusion across the disc.It has a dark, V-shaped transverse line and dark outer edge, otherwise numerous, narrow, brown transverse lines. Together with the brownish wing veins, these form the net pattern. The larva is yellowish, partially transparent so that the dark greenish intestines shine through. The head capsule is barely darker than the rest of the larva. Julius von Kennel provides a full description. Meyrick -Forewings suboblong, 7 to apex; pale yellowish, sharply reticulated with ferruginous orange, somewhat mixed with dark fuscous; a dark fuscous oblique stria from middle of costa, meeting a variable sometimes obsolete fuscous dorsal blotch, containing two small black scale tufts; a dark fuscous terminal streak. Hindwings whitishyellowish, more or less fuscous-tinged posteriorly.Larva pale yellow; head and plate of 2 greenish-tinged

The moth flies from June to September from dusk onwards.

The main food plants in Europe are field maple (Acer campestre) and sycamore (A. pseudoplatanus); the larvae can also be found on Norway maple (A. platanoides).

The name honours Peter Forsskål.
