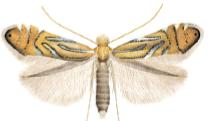

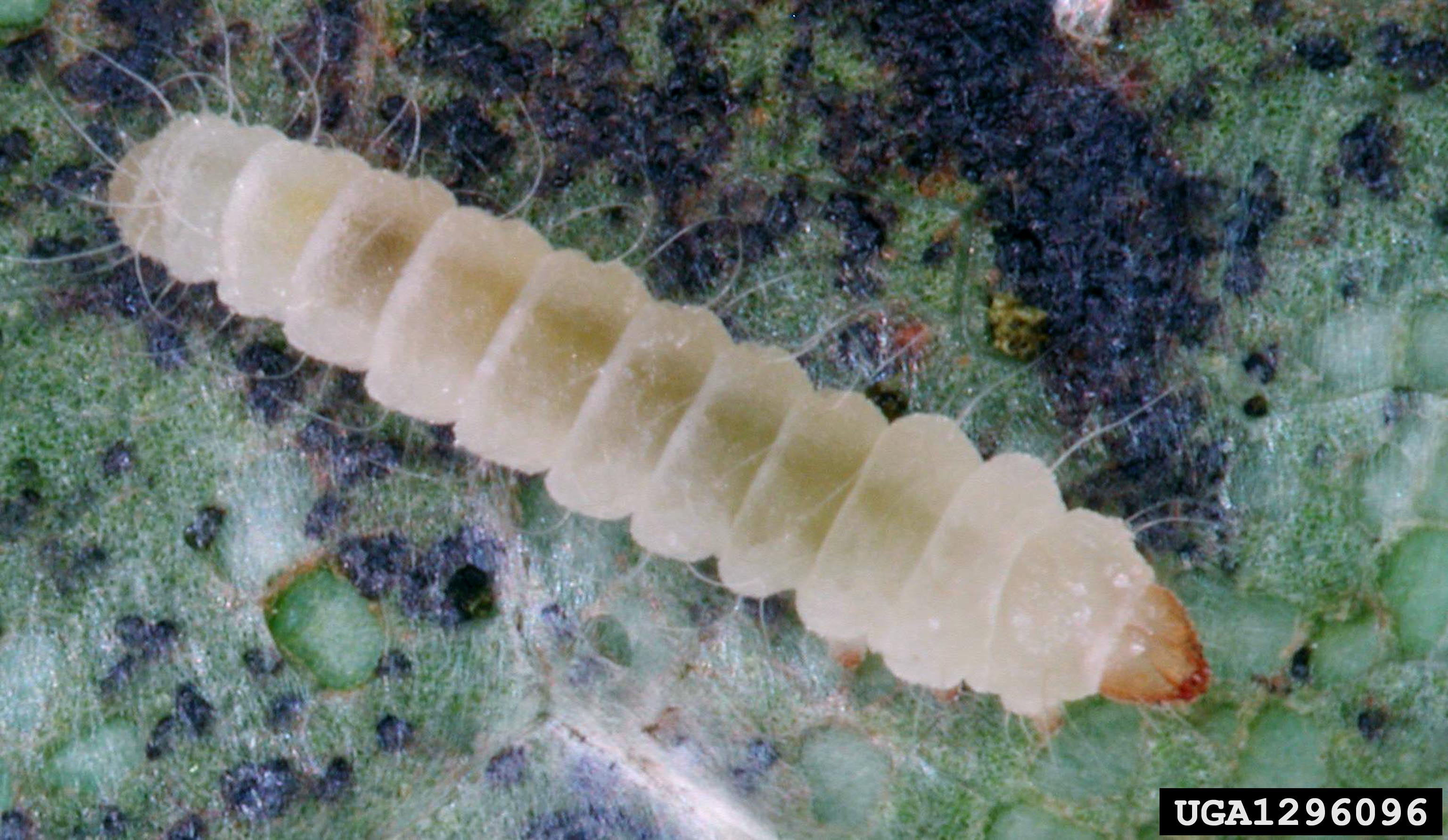
- Larva

Scientific classification
- Kingdom: Animalia
- Phylum: Arthropoda
- Clade: Pancrustacea
- Class: Insecta
- Order: Lepidoptera
- Family: Gracillariidae
- Genus: Phyllonorycter
- Species: P. platani

Binomial name
- Phyllonorycter platani Staudinger, 1870

Synonyms
- Phyllonorycter felinella Heinrich, 1920; Phyllonorycter felinelle Heinrich, 1920

= Phyllonorycter platani =

Species of moth

Phyllonorycter platani is a moth of the family Gracillariidae. The moth is found in Europe, the Near East and the eastern Palearctic realm, as well as California in the United States.

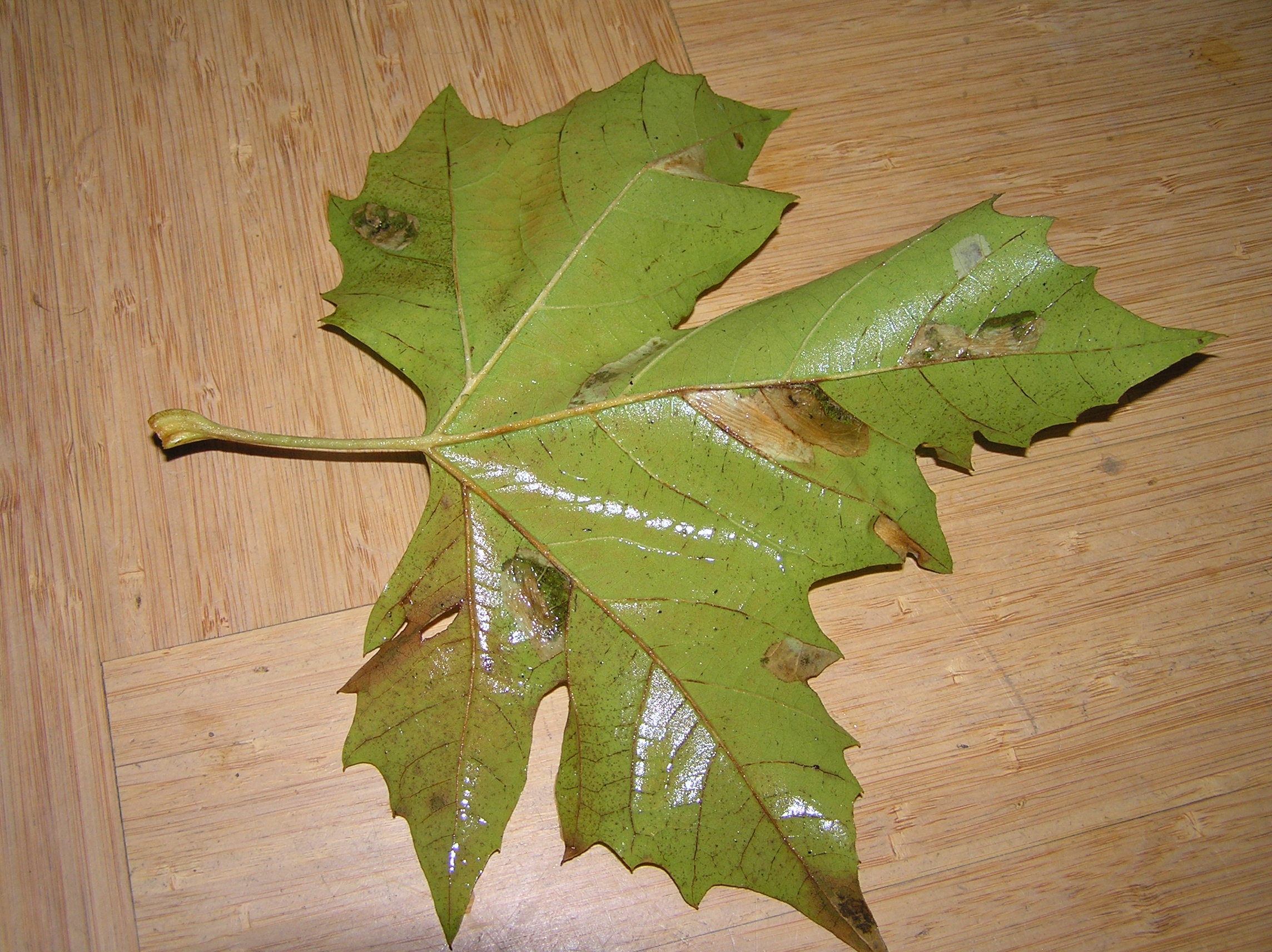
Mining in a Platanus leaf

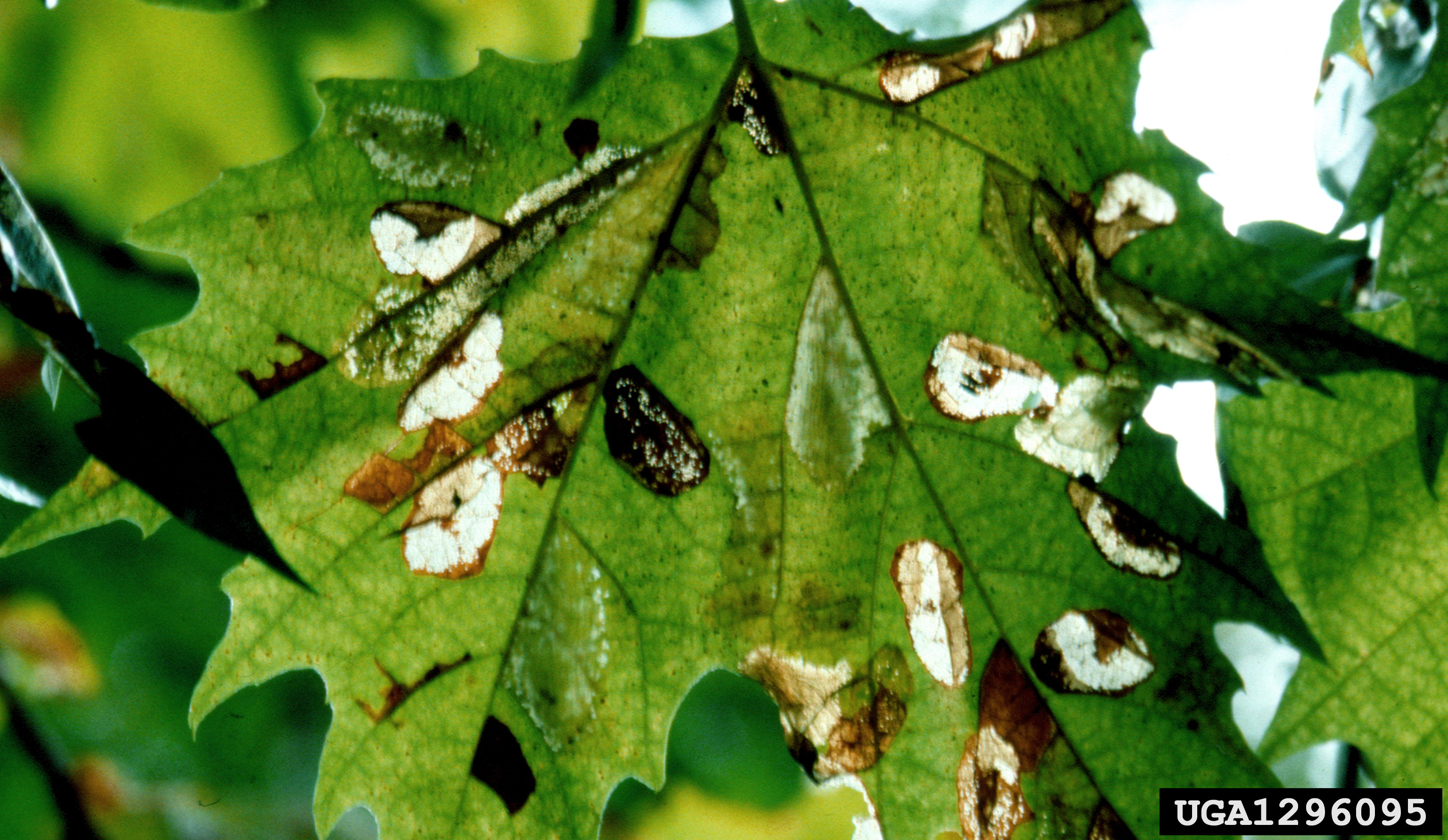
Damage

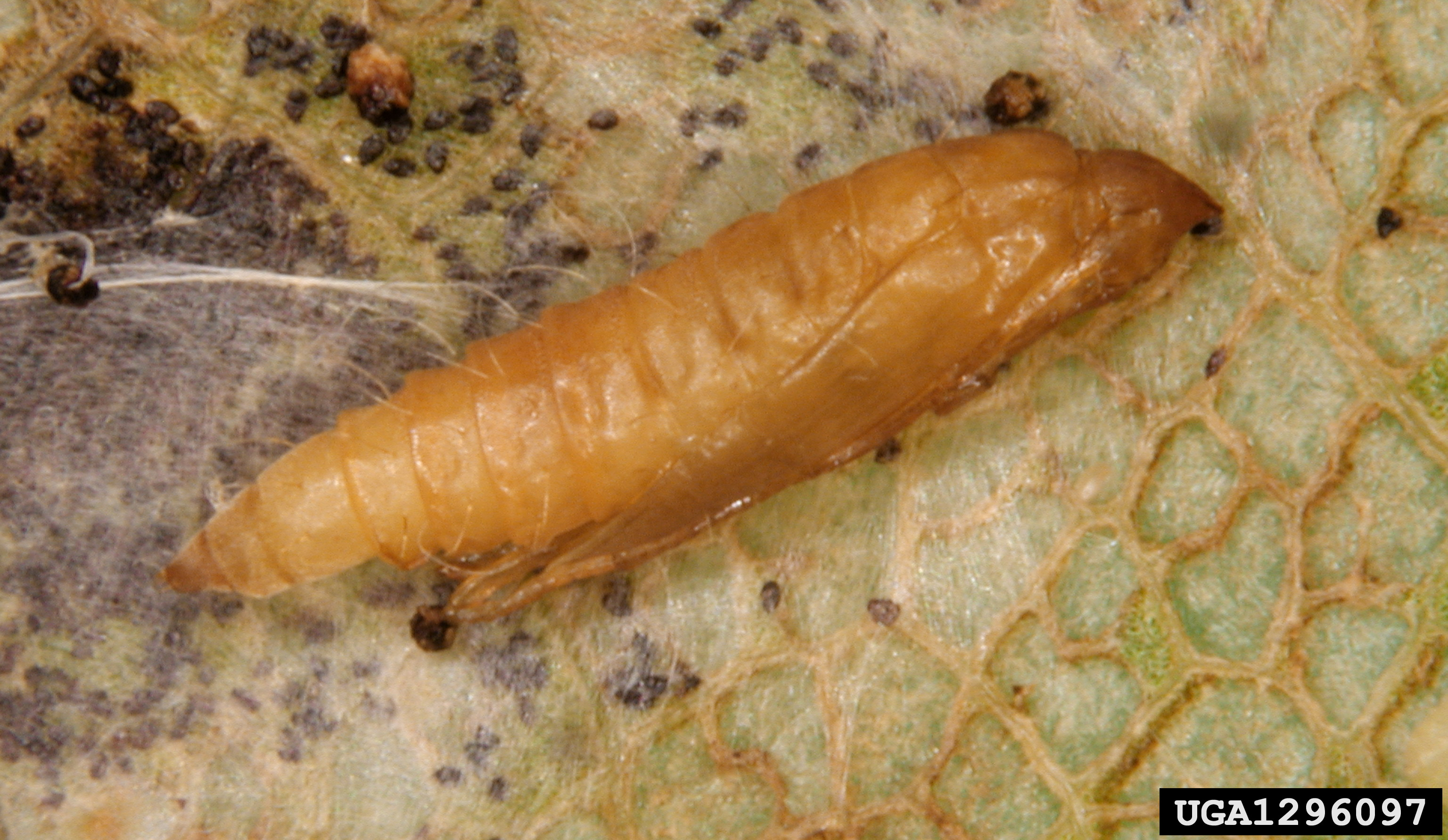
Pupa

The wingspan is 8–10 mm. It flies in two generations from mid-June to November..

The larvae feed on Platanus, including London Plane, from whence it derives its common name of London Midget.

== Notes ==
1. The flight season refers to Belgium and The Netherlands. This may vary in other parts of the range.
