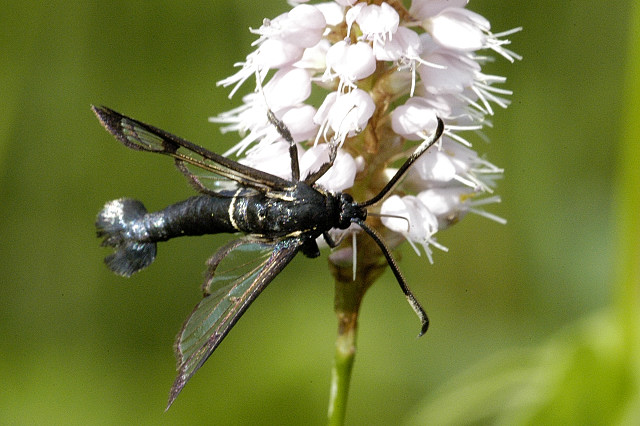

Scientific classification
- Kingdom: Animalia
- Phylum: Arthropoda
- Clade: Pancrustacea
- Class: Insecta
- Order: Lepidoptera
- Family: Sesiidae
- Genus: Synanthedon
- Species: S. spheciformis

Binomial name
- Synanthedon spheciformis (Denis & Schiffermüller, 1775)

Synonyms
- Sphinx spheciformis [Denis & Schiffermüller], 1775; Sesia sphegiformis Fabricius, 1787; Sphinx ichneumoniformis Borkhausen, 1789 (nec [Denis & Schiffermüller], 1775); Synanthedon spheciformis ab. triannulata Pazsiczky, 1941

= Synanthedon spheciformis =

Species of moth

Synanthedon spheciformis, the white-barred clearwing, is a moth of the family Sesiidae. It is found in Europe and Siberia.

The wingspan is 26–31 mm. The length of the forewings is 12–14 mm. The moth flies from May to June depending on the location.

The larvae feed on alder and birch. They bore the stem of their host plant.

== Gallery ==
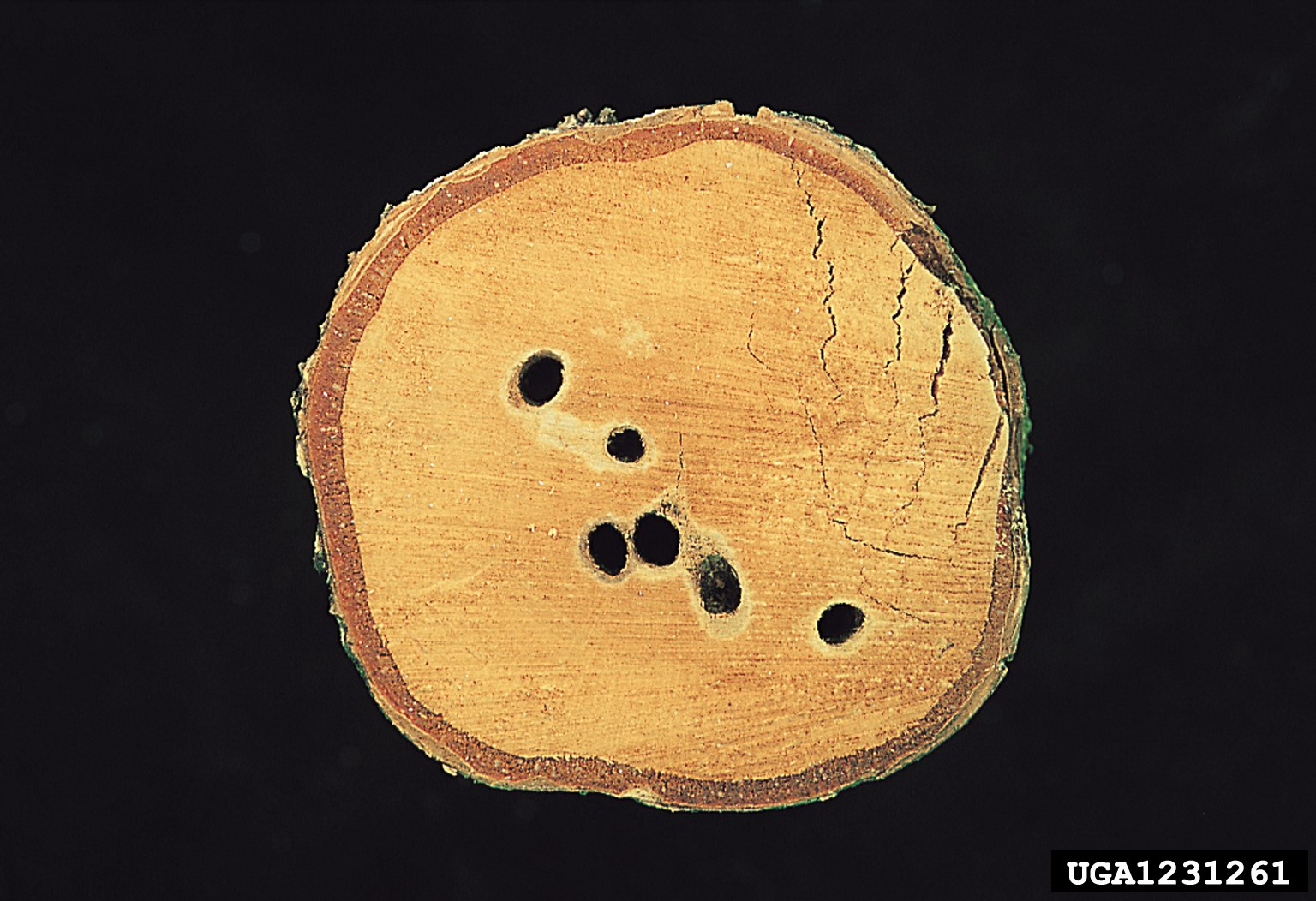
Boring damage

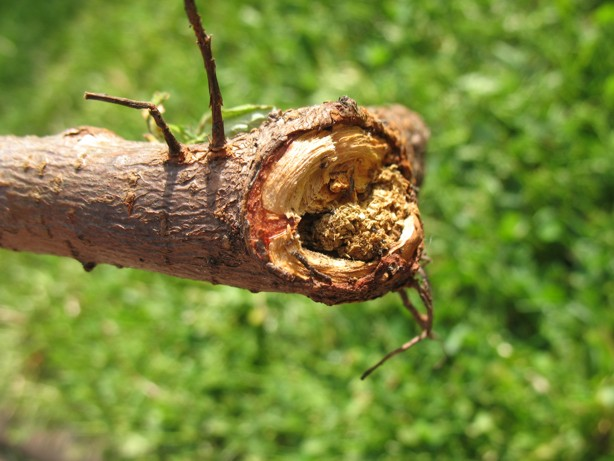
Damage

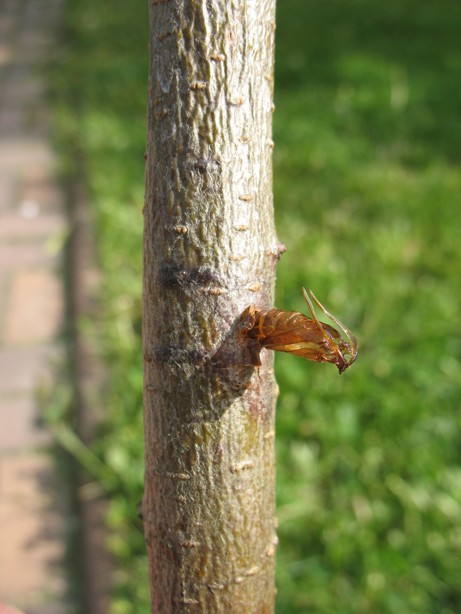
Pupa
