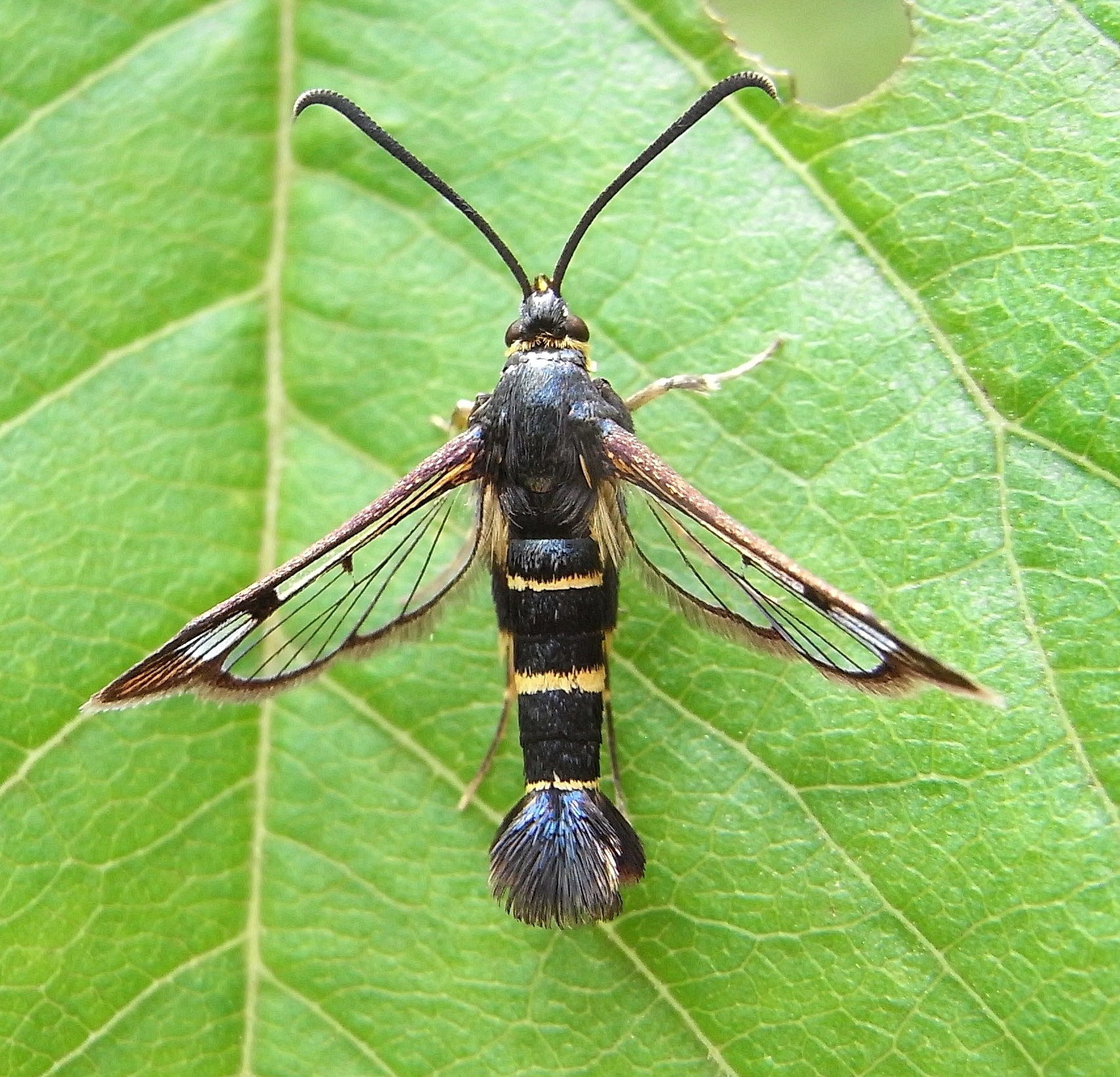

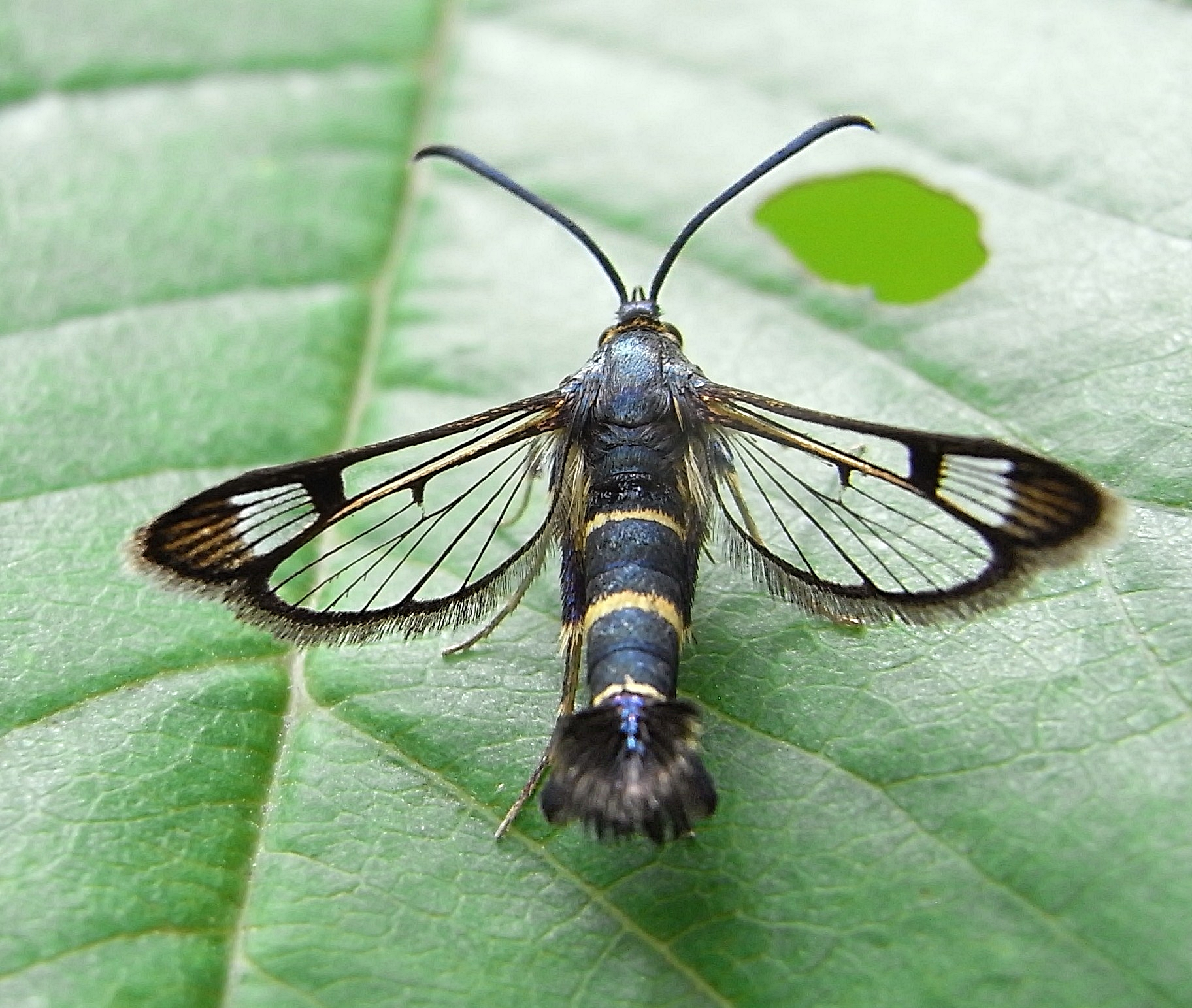

Scientific classification
- Kingdom: Animalia
- Phylum: Arthropoda
- Clade: Pancrustacea
- Class: Insecta
- Order: Lepidoptera
- Family: Sesiidae
- Genus: Synanthedon
- Species: S. spuleri

Binomial name
- Synanthedon spuleri (Fuchs, 1908)

Synonyms
- Sesia spuleri Fuchs, 1908; Aegeria schwarzi Králícek & Povolný, 1977

= Synanthedon spuleri =

Species of moth

Synanthedon spuleri is a moth of the family Sesiidae. It is found from France to Turkey and Georgia. In the south, it is found in southern and eastern Europe. In the north, the range extends to the line Paris-southern Germany.

The wingspan is 13–24 mm. Adults are on wing from mid May to the end of July. Adults feed on the nectar of various flowers, including Sambuccus nigra, Frangula alnus, Sambuccus ebulus, Rubus and Ligustrum species.

The larvae feed within galls on Juniperus communis, Juniperus chinensis, Juniperus phoenicea, Abies alba, Populus, Salix, Betula, Carpinus, Fagus, Corylus, Quercus, Acer and Ulmus. The species overwinters in the larval stage. Completing the life cycle takes two years.

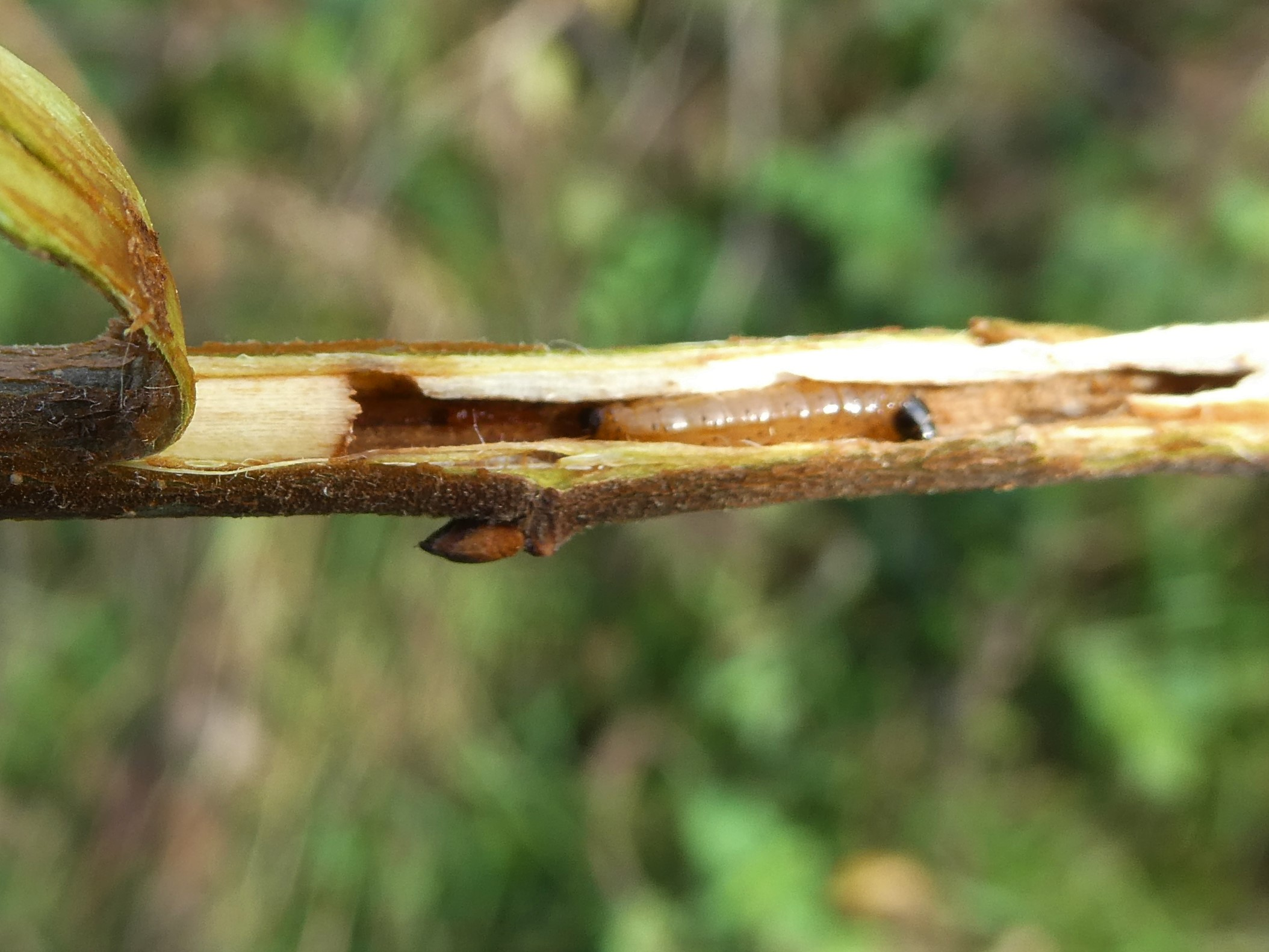
S. spuleri larva in twig of Ulmus laevis

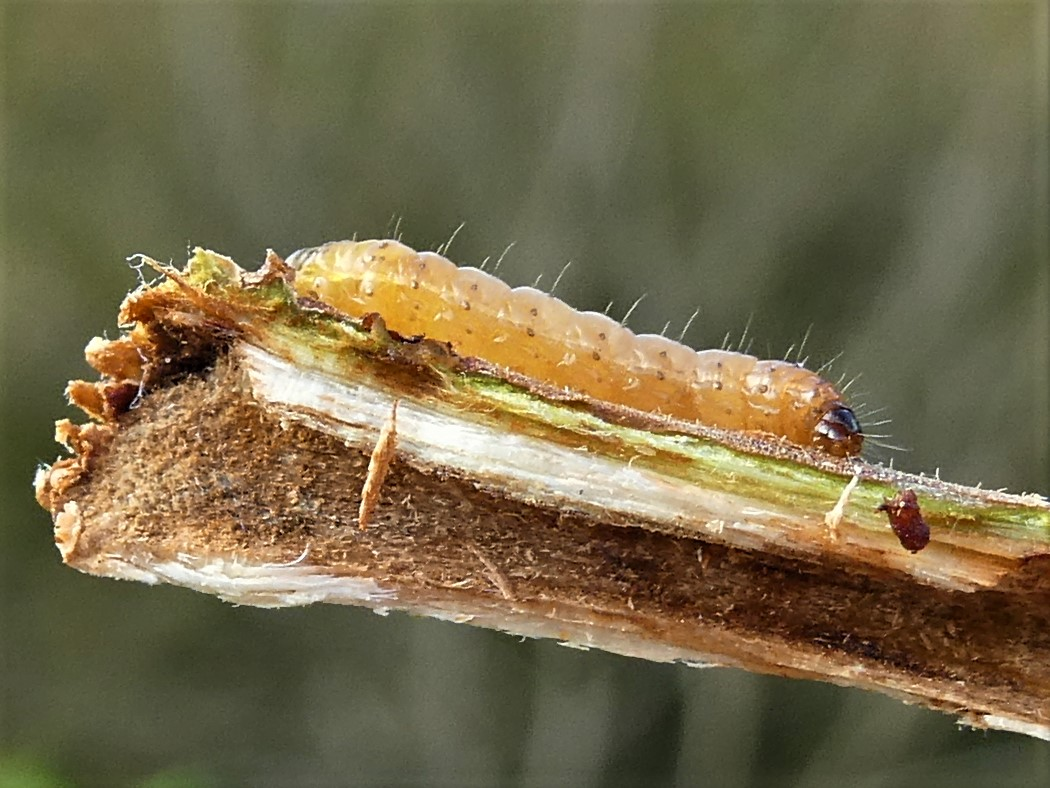
S. spuleri larva
