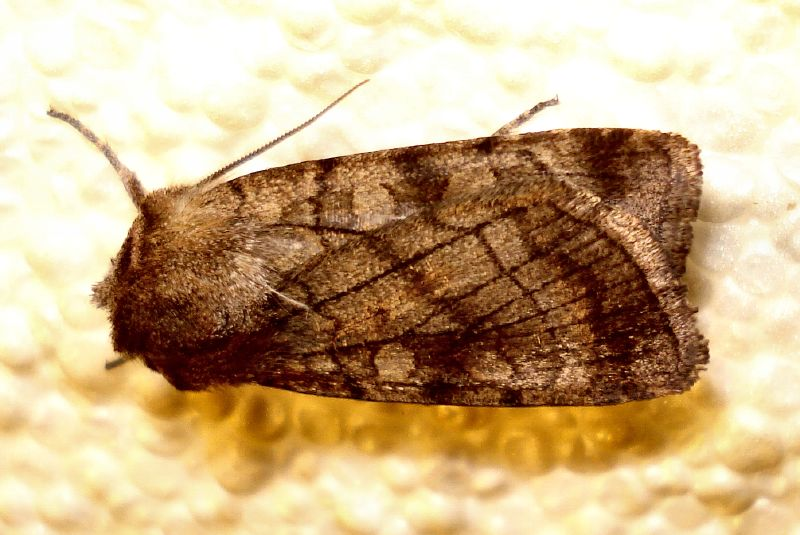

Scientific classification
- Kingdom: Animalia
- Phylum: Arthropoda
- Clade: Pancrustacea
- Class: Insecta
- Order: Lepidoptera
- Superfamily: Noctuoidea
- Family: Noctuidae
- Genus: Xestia
- Species: X. sexstrigata

Binomial name
- Xestia sexstrigata (Haworth, 1809)

Synonyms
- Amathes sexstrigata; Agrotis umbrosa; Rhyacia umbrosa

= Six-striped rustic =

Species of moth

The six-striped rustic (Xestia sexstrigata) is a moth of the family Noctuidae. It is distributed throughout Europe apart from the far south east.

This is a fairly small species with a wingspan of 36–38 mm. It has pale brown forewings marked with six dark fascia although some of these can be indistinct. The hindwings are pale buff, darker towards the margin.

== Technical description and variation ==
Forewing greyish rufous, the veins dark grey; stigmata with dark outlines; the claviform with the apex only marked; orbicular sometimes paler; lines and shades all dark and distinct; hindwing luteous fuscous, darker towards termen; fringe yellowish.

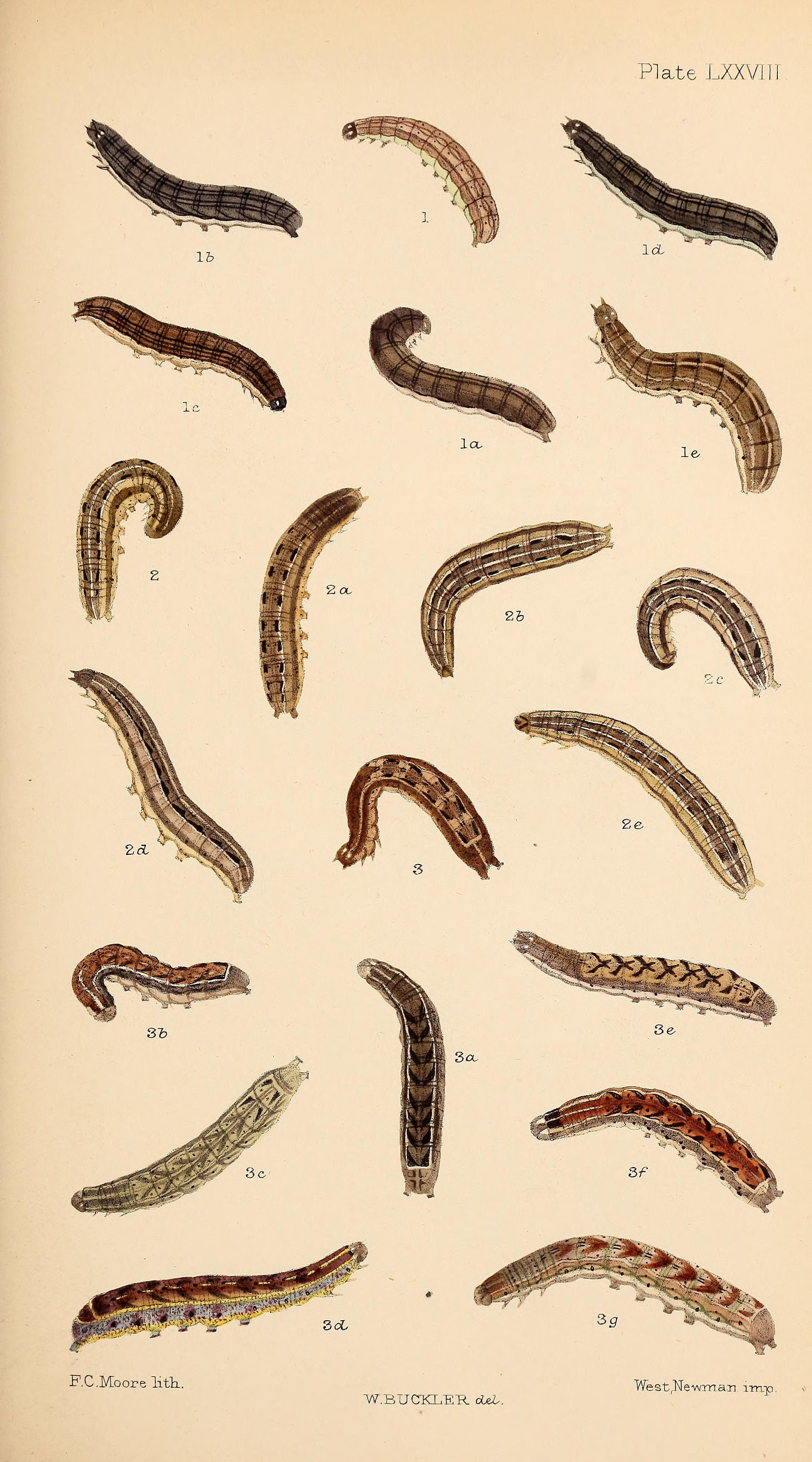
Figs 2, 2a, 2b, 2c, 2d, 2e larvae after final moult

== Biology ==
The moth flies at night in July and August and is attracted to light and sugar, as well as the flowers of ragwort.

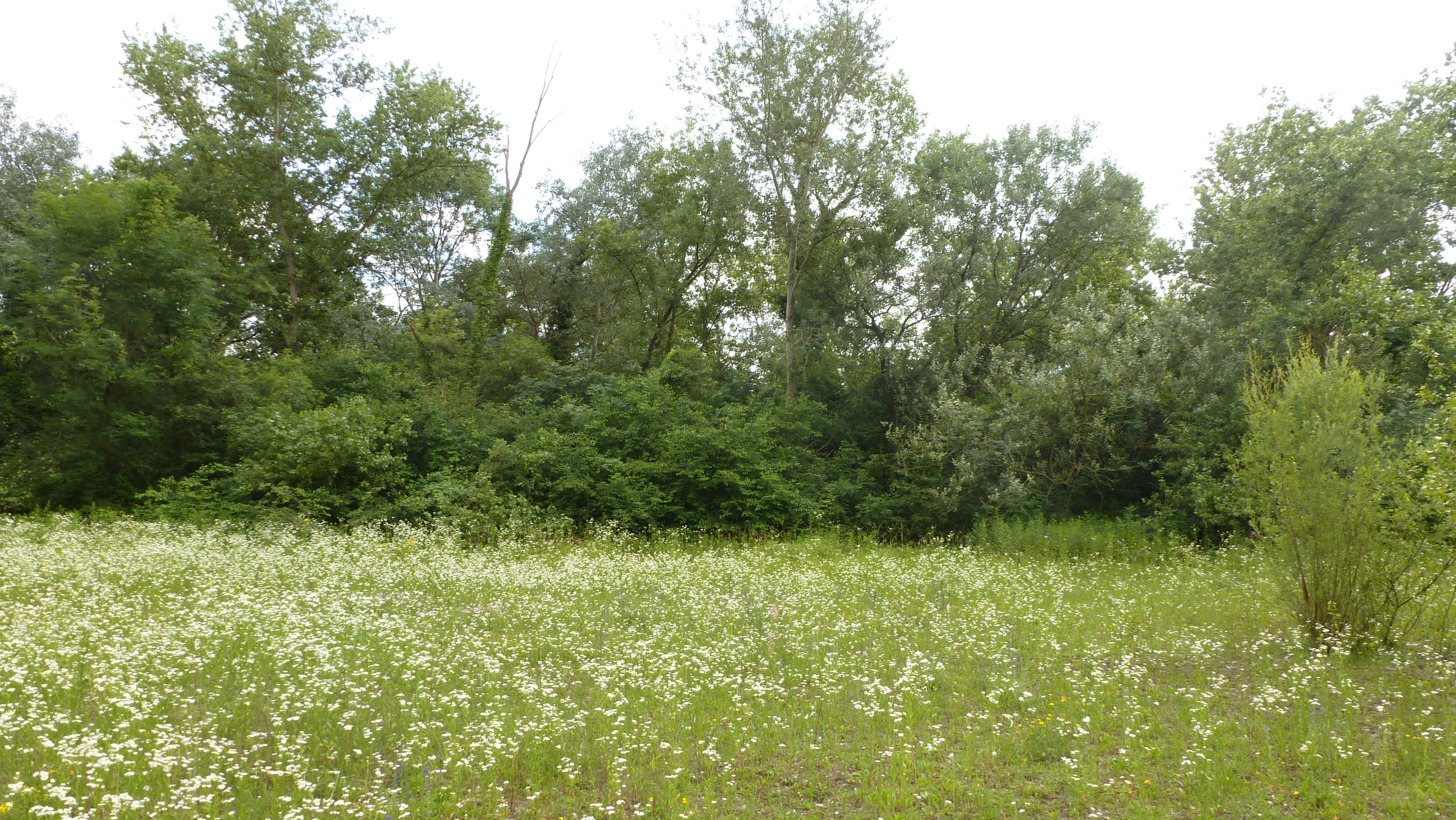
Habitat

Larva yellowish brown; dorsal and subdorsal lines pale, the latter black -edged above. The larva feeds on various herbaceous plants including dock, plantain and various grasses. The species overwinters as a larva.

1. The flight season refers to the British Isles. This may vary in other parts of the range.
