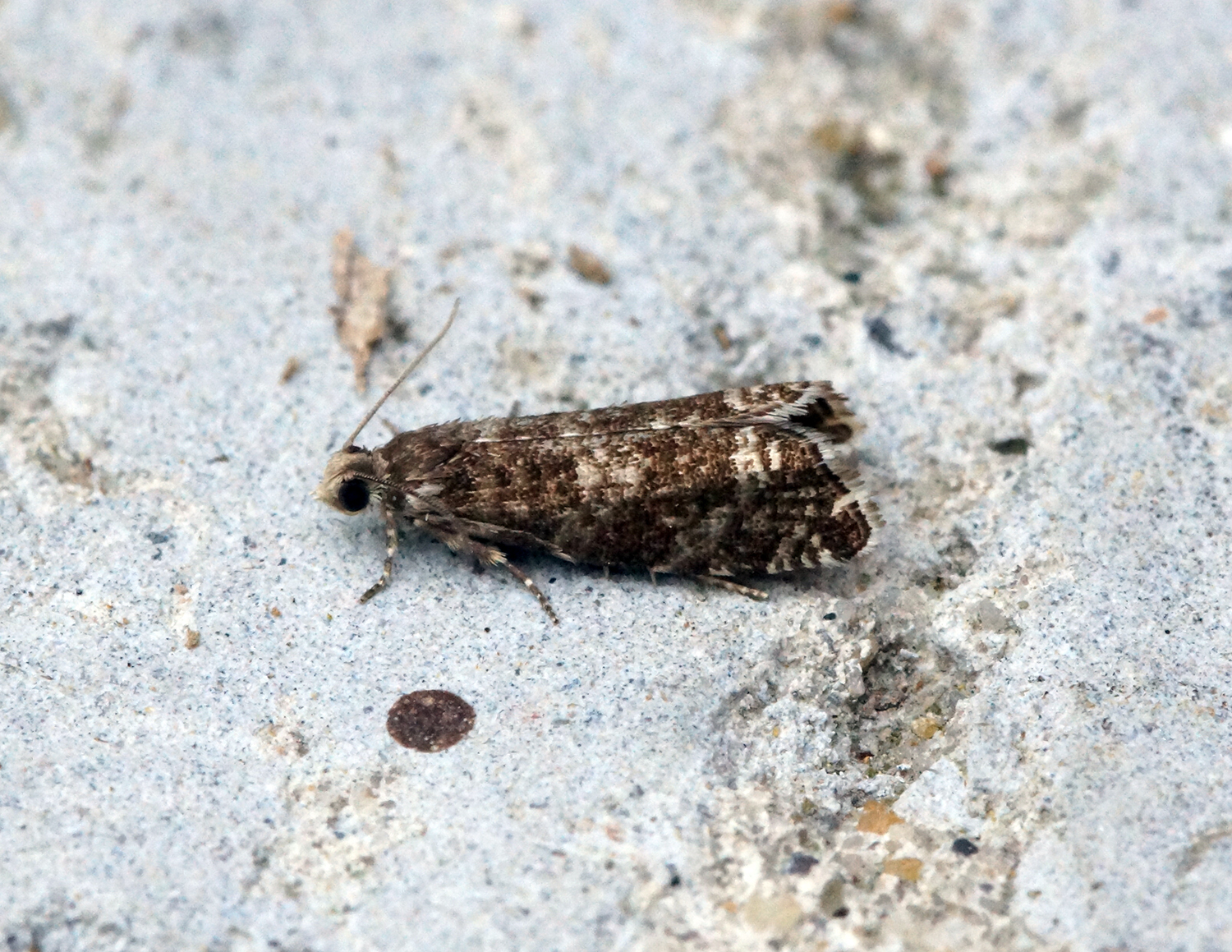

Scientific classification
- Domain: Eukaryota
- Kingdom: Animalia
- Phylum: Arthropoda
- Class: Insecta
- Order: Lepidoptera
- Family: Tortricidae
- Genus: Epinotia
- Species: E. nanana

Binomial name
- Epinotia nanana (Treitschke, 1835)

= Epinotia nanana =

Species of moth

Epinotia nanana, the European spruce needleminer, is a moth of the family Tortricidae. It is found from northern and central Europe to Russia and Mongolia.

Epinotia nanana has been found in British Columbia, Ontario, and Quebec in Canada, and from Maine to Michigan and Ohio in the United States. The larvae feed on most species of spruce, but prefer Norway spruce. The nearly full-grown larvae overwinter in mined needles and resume feeding in the early spring in adjacent needles. Each larva then mines from 6 to 10 needles and secures them to the twig with silk. Full-grown larvae, about 9mm long, pupate in a silken cocoon in the soil litter, or occasionally on the tree in May or June. The pupae become moths in four weeks and the females lay eggs, usually singly, occasionally in clusters, on needles produced in the previous year. The eggs soon hatch, and the larvae feed in needles during summer and fall, and hibernate in the mined needles.

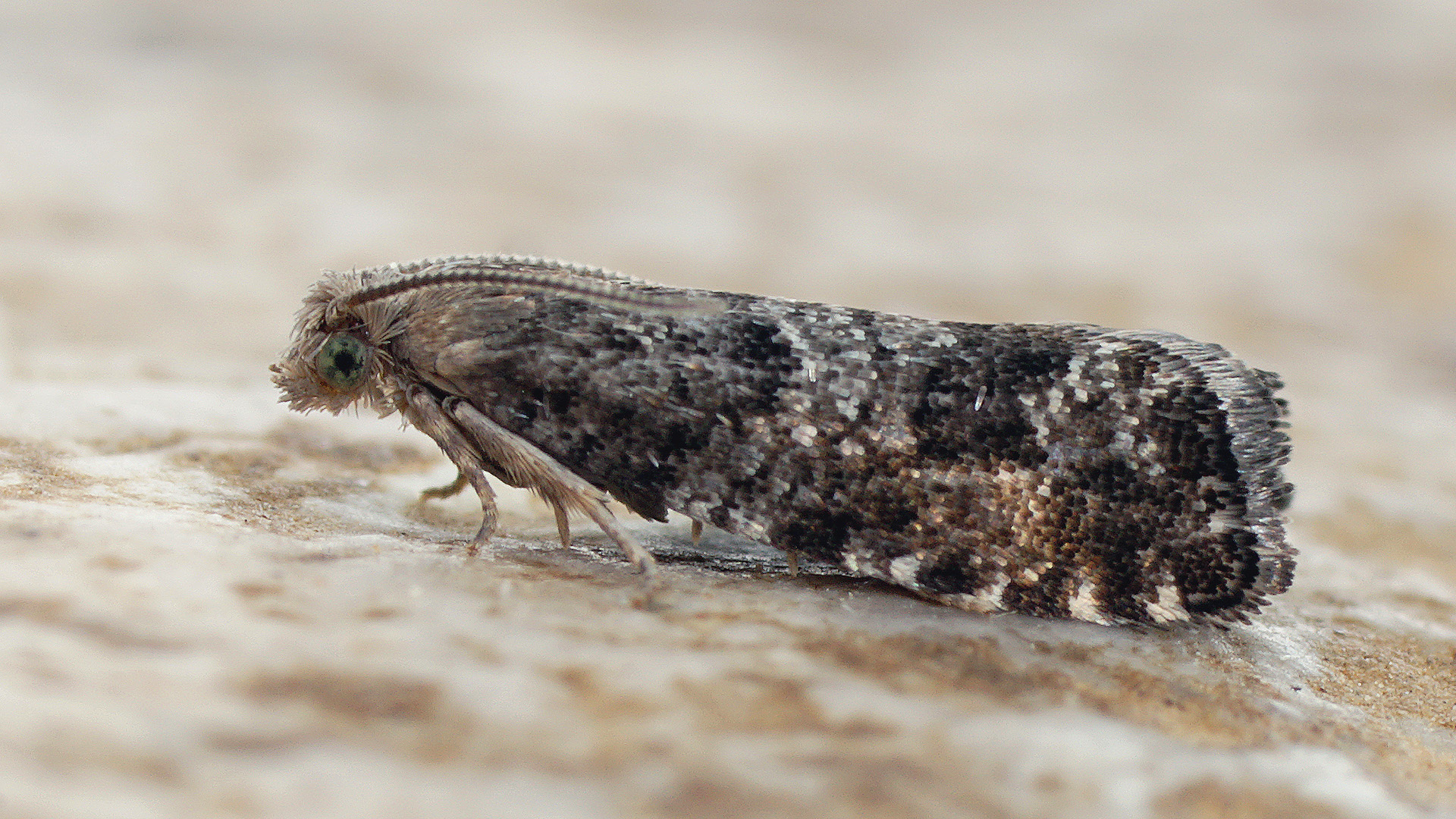

The wingspan is 9–11mm. The head is pale brownish-ochreous, the face whitish. The forewings have a gently arched costa. The ground colour is lighter or darker fuscous, whitish-sprinkled. The costa is strigulated with dark fuscous and white. The edge of the basal patch is obtusely angulated below middle. The central fascia has a posterior median projection, and there is transverse streak before apex. These markings are dark fuscous. The hindwings are rather dark fuscous. The larva is brown; head and plate of 2 black

Adults are on wing from June to August.

The larvae feed on Picea abies, Picea excelsa, Picea pungens and Picea sitchensis. They mine the needles of the host plant.
