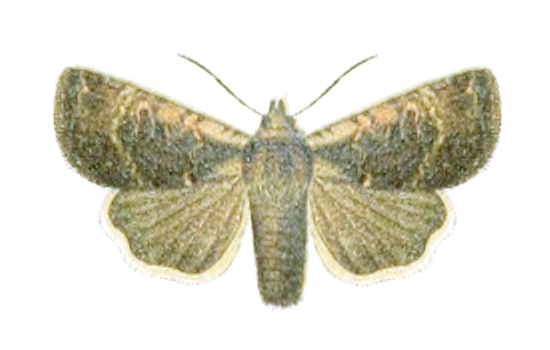
- Eugraphe sigma imago

Scientific classification
- Kingdom: Animalia
- Phylum: Arthropoda
- Clade: Pancrustacea
- Class: Insecta
- Order: Lepidoptera
- Superfamily: Noctuoidea
- Family: Noctuidae
- Subfamily: Noctuinae
- Genus: Eugraphe; Hübner, [1821]

Type species
- Noctua sigma [Denis & Schiffermüller], 1775

Diversity
- Possibly monotypic, but see text

Synonyms
- Eugrapha (lapsus) and see text

= Eugraphe =

Genus of moths

Eugraphe is a genus of noctuid moths (family Noctuidae). They belong to the tribe Xestiini of the typical noctuid subfamily Noctuinae, though some do not separate this tribe and include the genus in the Noctuini. It is closely related to Anagnorisma, Coenophila and Eugnorisma, and as it seems most closely to the first of these (see also below). The geographic range is Palearctic, north of the Alpides but including the Caucasus, and between the Arctic and the arid lands of Central Asia.

Serving for some time to assemble some more or less superficially Xestiini, more recently most species have been moved elsewhere, e.g. to the newly established Goniographa and Pseudohermonassa, to the revalidated Ammogrotis, Coenophila and Hypernaenia (which had all been included in Eugraphe earlier), or to the long-known Xestia (though placement there is still provisional). Indeed, it may be that the genus is monotypic, or turn out to be better considered a junior synonym or some earlier-described taxon. On the other hand, considering it was established early in the 19th century, it might also eventually come to include later-described genera as junior synonyms. And of course, given that Noctuidae are still being described on a regular basis, additional as yet discovered species might exist.

== Description ==
E. sigma, the type and possibly only species, is a mid-sized noctuine with a stout body and almost uniformly dark brown wings. There is some reddish or buffy suffusion on the leading edge of the forewings and a thin cream-colored margin to the hindwings. The forewing markings are indistinct except for a roundish and a kidney-shaped stigma, which are blacker than the rest of the wing and surrounded by a thin band of reddish brown. Altogether, the moths do not resemble their closest relatives much (arguing for retention of the genus as monotypic, at least for the time being), rather appearing somewhat like certain species of Graphiphora and Spaelotis.

The male genitalia resemble those of Anagnorisma, most conspicuously differing in the vesica penis. In Eugraphe, this has a number of sclerotized (hardened) ribs in the inner curve and a shorter and more delicate subbasal cornutus; the latter also serves to differentiate Eugraphe from Coenophila. The lack of subterminal cornuti is a tell-tale mark of the present genus versus Eugnorisma. Most characteristic in the female genitalia is the ostium bursae, which has posterolateral extensions shaped like a bear's ears. However, similar extensions is also present in some Anagnorisma, whose female genital structure is generally comparable (but never entirely alike).

== Species ==
- Eugraphe sigma ([Denis & Schiffermüller], 1775)

Tentatively placed here:

- Eugraphe versuta (Püngeler 1909) (sometimes in Xestia; actually Goniographa?)
  - Xestia versuta agalmona Bryk, 1949
