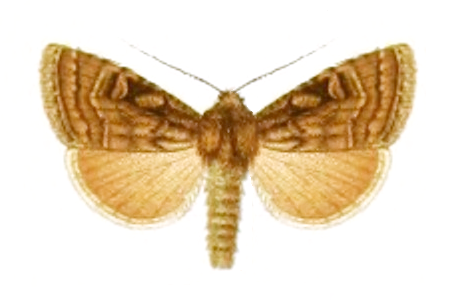
- Goniographa marcida imago

Scientific classification
- Kingdom: Animalia
- Phylum: Arthropoda
- Clade: Pancrustacea
- Class: Insecta
- Order: Lepidoptera
- Superfamily: Noctuoidea
- Family: Noctuidae
- Subfamily: Noctuinae
- Genus: Goniographa; Varga & Ronkay, 2002

Type species
- Agrotis decussa Staudinger, 1897

Diversity
- 8 species, possibly more

= Goniographa =

Genus of moths

Goniographa is a genus of noctuid moths (family Noctuidae). They belong to the tribe Xestiini of the typical noctuid subfamily Noctuinae, though some do not separate this tribe and include the genus in the Noctuini.

This genus was only established in 2002, when a group of species was newly described and discovered to be relatives of some long-known species traditionally placed in Eugraphe.

== Description ==
These moths have the usual noctuine shape, with a rather hairy and plump body. Their wingspan is about 30–35 mm, with a forewing length of about 15 mm or somewhat less. In color and pattern, they are quite similar to other Xestiini: their buff forewings typically have a dark brownish submarginal band and sprinkles, in particular two larger and angular dots in the cell are almost invariably present. The hindwings are creamy white or light buff, shading to a darker buffy hue towards the submargin, with the thin marginal band abruptly lighter again.

As was commented upon in the mid-20th century already, the genitalia of Goniographa resemble those of other Xestiini, most notably Eugnorisma, more than they resemble the true Eugraphe (E. sigma and any close allies it might have). The female genitalia are generally similar to Eugnorisma and Protognorisma in their strongly sclerotized (hardened) bursal apparatus. While differing in some details it is roughly intermediate between the plump and more robust of the former and the slender and more delicate of the latter. The male genitalia are more characteristic; especially the valval tip with its three pointed projections is conspicuous (though at least in this general form found in other genera too). Furthermore, the unornamented vesica penis points dorsally and bears an evertible toothed bar. This combination of characters is unique, as far is hitherto known.

== Species ==
The 8 hitherto known species fall into 3 groups:

decussa-group

- Goniographa decussa
- Goniographa discussa
- Goniographa shchetkini

funkei-group

- Goniographa funkei
- Goniographa metafunkei
- Goniographa naumanni

marcida-group

- Goniographa marcida
- Goniographa gyulaipeteri

Some other members of Eugraphe sensu lato, e.g. "E." versuta, are also probably not assigned to the correct genus. Whether they belong here is not yet determined.
