= Talat Basari =

Iranian poet and writer (1923–2020)

Talat Bassari
- طلعت بصاري
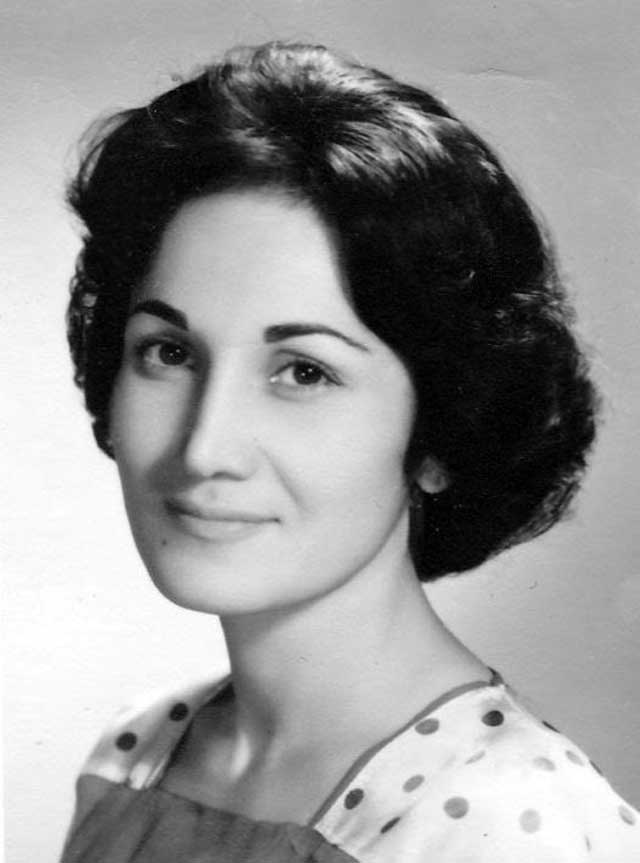
- Talat Bassari in the 1960s
- Born: 1923; Babol, Mazandaran, Sublime State of Iran
- Died: 18 September 2020 (aged 97); Los Angeles, California, United States
- Occupations: Poet, writer
- Known for: Vice President of Jundishapour University (1956–1979)
- Spouse: Abolghasem Gheble (m. 1941)
- Children: 4

Tal'at Bassari (Persian: طلعت بصاري, 1923 – 18 September 2020), was an Iranian Baháʼí poet, feminist, academic, and writer.

== Biography ==
Born in the city of Babol along the Caspian Sea, Bassari received a PhD in Persian language and literature and lectured at secondary schools in the Iranian capital Tehran. She was the first woman to be appointed as vice-chancellor of a university in Iran when she worked at the Jondishapur University in Ahvaz, during the 1960s. The university was instated in the 20th century by the Pahlavi dynasty to commemorate the ancient Sasanian academy of Gundeshapur. In the aftermath of the Islamic revolution and because of her belief in the Baháʼí Faith, she was dismissed from her university position and eventually migrated to the United States.

Bassari published extensive critiques on Persian literature including the national epic Shahnameh written by the celebrated Persian poet Ferdowsi. Her critiques have been listed by prominent Iranian historian Iraj Afshar as recommended descriptive reading surrounding the literature of Shahnameh. In 2018, she published a 347-page book titled Women of Shahnameh (Ketabsara; 2018) that studied the female characters in the epic. Each character is individually analysed and include Soudabeh, wife of Shah Kay Kāvus, Tahmineh, wife of the hero Rostam, Gordafarid, a champion who symbolised courage and hope for women, and Faranak, mother to Fereydoun who is a hero from the Kingdom of Varna. In 1967, she had also published a biography on Zandokht Shirazi, a pioneer in the feminist movement in Iran.

She resided in New Jersey. She also worked on the editorial board of the New Jersey–based magazine, Persian Heritage. She identified as Baháʼí. Bassari also assisted in books on the life of the influential Persian Bahai poet Táhirih, and contributed with Persian to English translations in academia.

=== Recognition ===
A portrait of her was amongst those exhibited at the Women of Persia art exhibit in Issaquah Highlands, Seattle, United States of America.

== See also ==
- Women's rights movement in Iran
- Zandokht Shirazi
