= Academy of Gondishapur =

Sasanian center of education in Iran

Coordinates: 32°17′N 48°31′E

- فرهنگستان گندی‌شاپور
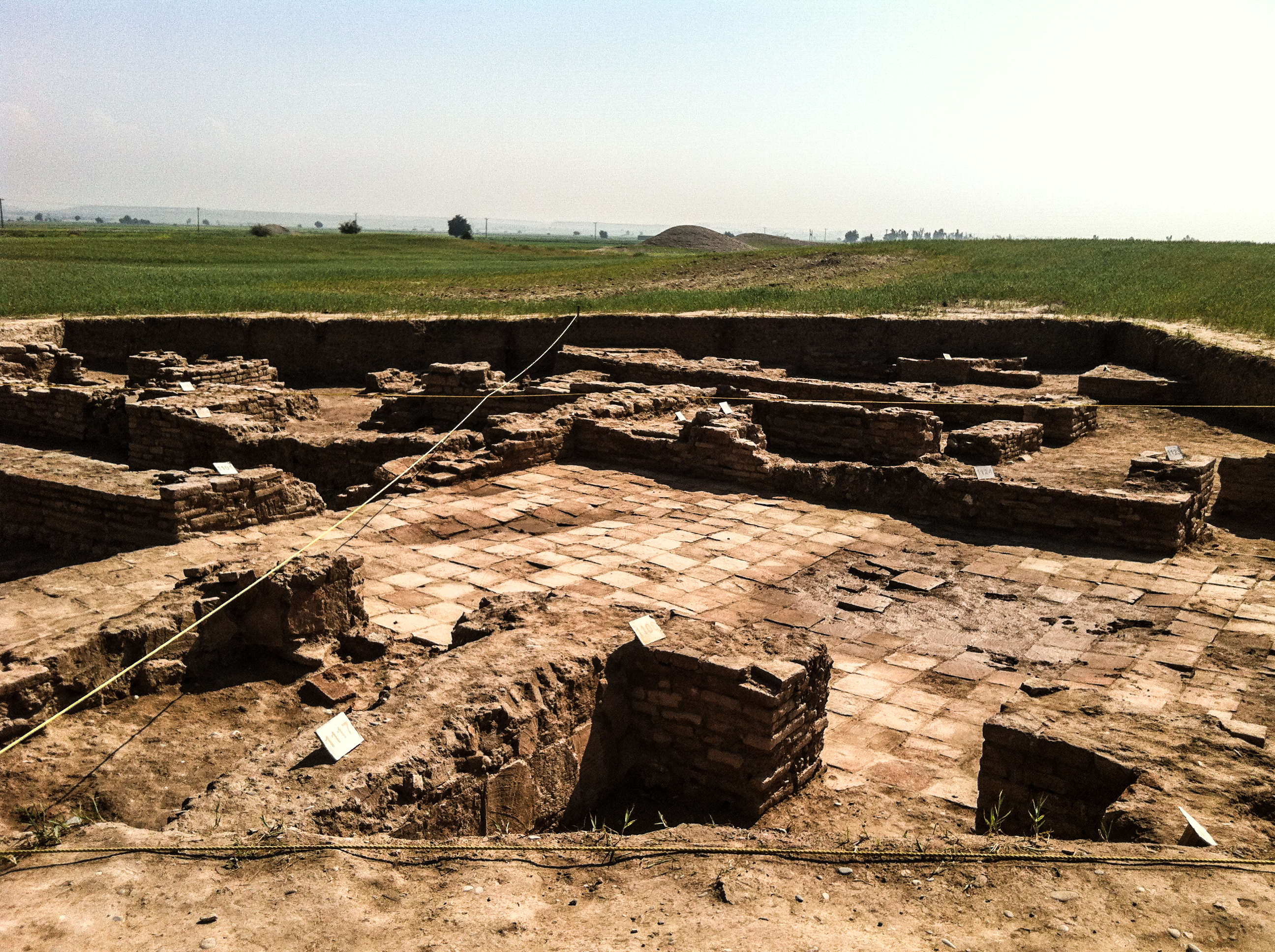
- Archeological site of Gondishapur
- Established: 240–270 AD
- Founder: Shapur I
- Location: Gundeshapur, Khuzestan, Iran

The Academy of Gondishapur (Note: Also called the Academy of Gondeshapur, Academy of Jondishapur, or Academy of Gundishapur) (Persian: فرهنگستان گندی‌شاپور, Farhangestân-e Gondišâpur), also known as the Gondishapur University, is a Sassanid-era center of education and academy of learning in Khuzestan, Iran. Founded by the Sassanid king Shapur I, Gondishapur first offered education and training in medicine, philosophy, theology and science. With a history spanning more than 1,700 years, it also included a hospital and a library. Since its activity was interrupted several times throughout history, Gondishapur is considered the oldest known university in terms of historical origin, while Al-Qarawiyyin in Morocco remains as the world’s oldest continuously operating university.

The modern concept of a hospital as a center for both treatment and medical training took shape at Gondishapur, giving it significant influence over the history of medical science. The academy’s hospital was the most important medical institution in the ancient world during the 6th and 7th centuries AD. The distinguished historian of science George Sarton called Gondishapur “the greatest intellectual center of the time.”

In 1955 under the Pahlavi dynasty, the Academy received a twin with the establishment of Ahvaz Jundishapur University of Medical Sciences, near the city of Ahvaz. During the Iran–Iraq War in 1980s, Mostafa Chamran used parts of the university as his command base. After his death, in honor of his bravery and sacrifices, the Ahvaz Jundishapur University was renamed to Shahid Chamran University of Ahvaz, while the main university kept its ancient name Gondishapur. The university's original campus is now an archaeological site, while it continues to operate under the same name in its modern building. Today, the Gondishapur and Shahid Chamran Universities operate 3 campuses, 9 schools, 15 colleges, and more than 65 hospitals.

== Name and archaeology ==
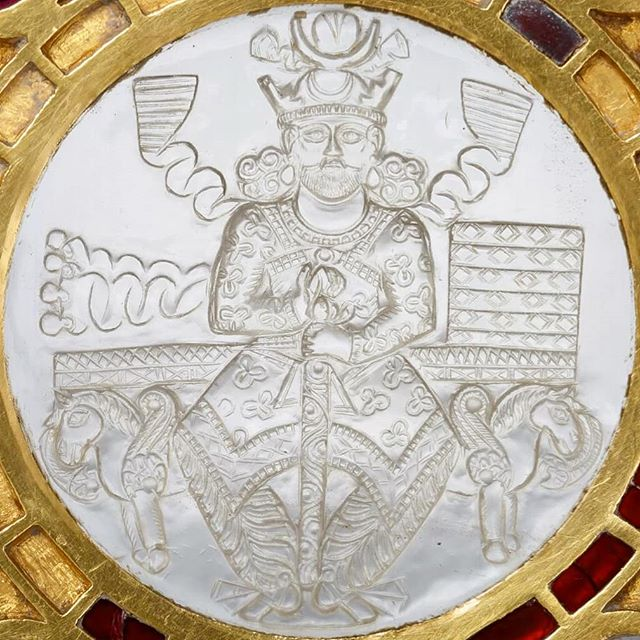
Gondishapur reached the height of its flourishing during the reign of Khosrow I (r. 531–579 AD)

According to Richard Frye, the name Gundishapur is a corrupted form of Veh-Andiukh-Shapur, meaning “Better than Antioch, built by Shapur.” According to most sources on the history of medicine in the Islamic era, this scholarly center played a significant role in transmitting Greek, Iranian, and Indian medical knowledge into the Islamic world. The first hospitals of the Islamic period were established based on the model of the Gundishapur hospital. Nevertheless, the available historical information is insufficient to present a precise picture of the city’s scientific and cultural conditions. What Islamic-era sources recount about its scholarly past often borders on legend. Modern research as well sometimes contains unsubstantiated or exaggerated claims, making it very difficult to determine the accuracy of this information.

Ibn al-Nadim writes that Ardashir I collected all remaining scattered ancient Persian books from India and China and added them to the royal treasury. His son, Shapur I, continued this path, gathering all texts that had been translated into Middle Persian from other languages. He also compiled the Avesta into a single book, thus restoring it after Alexander had burned it. Another library built during this period was the library of Khosrow I in Gundishapur, created for the university. His well-known passion for collecting books from the farthest regions of the world enriched it greatly.

Gundishapur became the finest research center of the Sassanid era. Many scholars of diverse backgrounds—especially Nestorians—gathered there, and numerous works were translated into Persian by order of Khosrow I. Besides these two libraries, other large and reputable libraries also existed; every fire temple and shrine, as well as all hospitals, research institutions, and educational centers, maintained their own collections of books.

== History ==
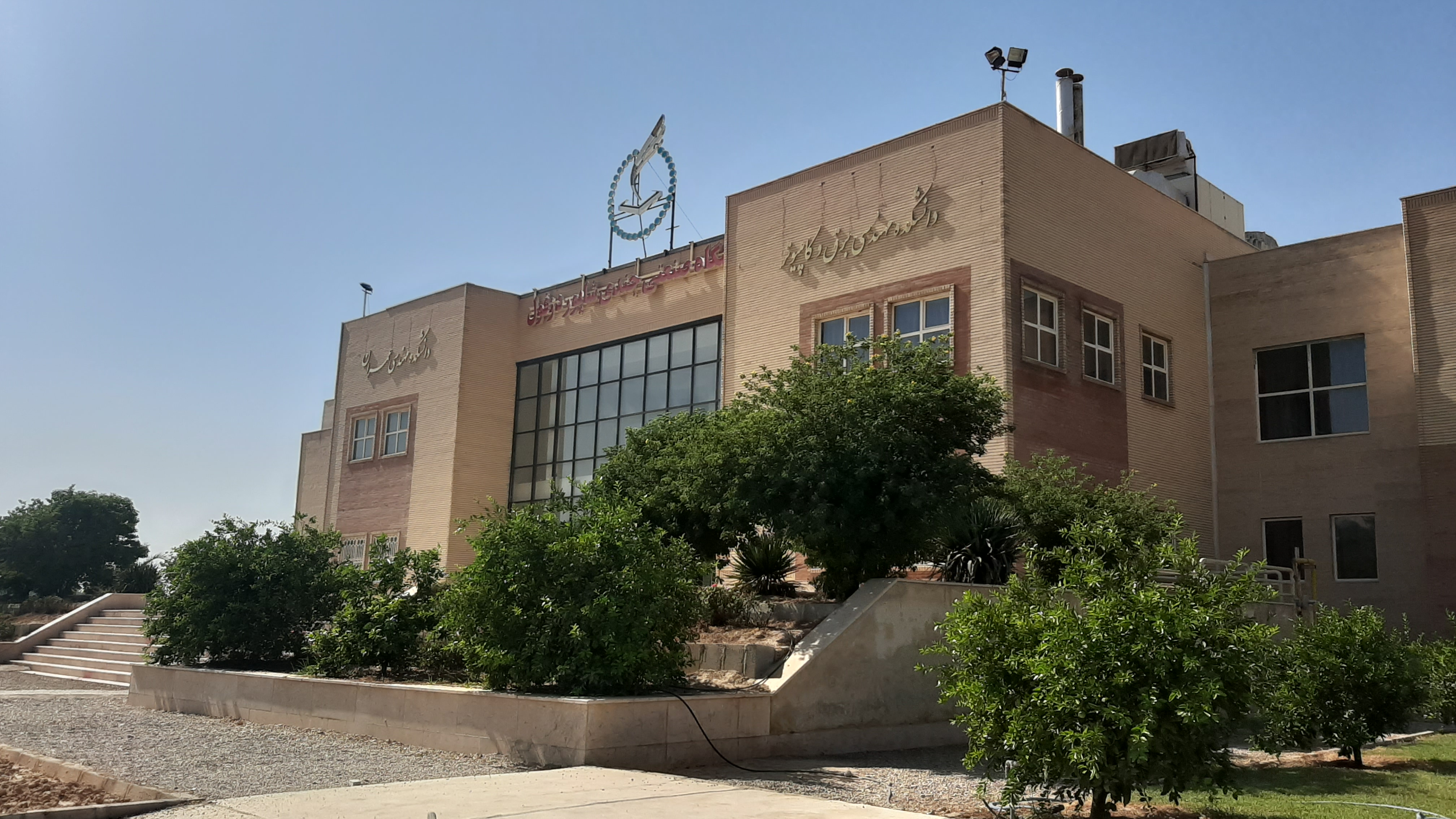
Faculty of Computer Engineering and IT, Gondishapur University.

In 489 AD, the East Syriac Christian theological and scientific center in Edessa was ordered closed by the Byzantine emperor Zeno; it was transferred and absorbed into the School of Nisibis in Mesopotamia, also known as Nisibīn, then under Persian rule. Here, Nestorian scholars, together with Hellenistic philosophers banished from Athens by Justinian in 529, carried out important research in medicine, astronomy, and mathematics.

However, it was under the rule of the Sassanid emperor Khosrau I (a.d. 531-579), known to the Greeks and Romans as Chosroes, that Gondishapur became known for medicine and learning. Khosrau I gave refuge to various Greek philosophers and Syriac-speaking Nestorian Christians fleeing religious persecution by the Byzantine Empire. The Sassanids had long battled the Romans and Byzantines for control of present-day Iraq and Syria and were naturally disposed to welcome the refugees.

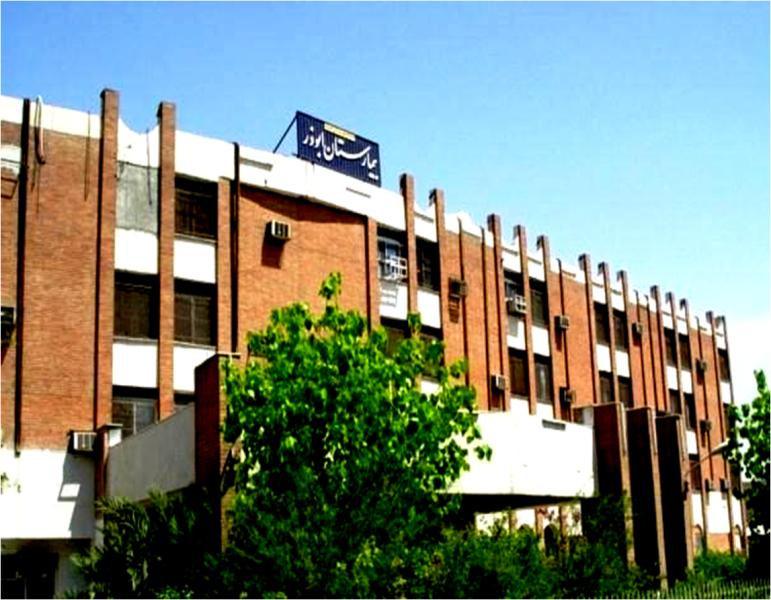
A hospital in Ahvaz, affiliated with the Gondishapur University of Medical Sciences

Khosrau I also turned towards the east, and sent the physician Borzouye to invite Indian and Chinese scholars to Gondishapur. These visitors translated Indian texts on astronomy, astrology, mathematics and medicine and Chinese texts on herbal medicine and religion. Borzouye is said to have himself translated the Pañcatantra from Sanskrit into Persian as Kalila u Dimana.

Emperor Khosrau I commissioned the refugees to translate Greek and Syriac texts into Middle Persian. They translated various works on medicine, astronomy, philosophy, and useful crafts.

A Church of the East monastery was established in the city of Gondishapur sometime before 376/7. By the 6th century the city became famed for its theological school where Rabban Hormizd once studied. According to a letter from the Catholicos of the East Timothy I, the Metropolitanate of Beth Huzaye took charge of both the theological and medical institutions.

Although almost all the physicians of the medical academy were Persians, yet they wrote their treatises in Syriac, because medicine had a literary tradition in Syriac.

At the Academy of Gundishapur during the Sassanid era, there was a dedicated department focused on collecting information about the illnesses of seafarers and methods for treating them. During the exploratory naval expeditions of the Achaemenid period, physicians accompanied the fleets to provide medical care for sailors.

=== Post-Islam decline ===
In 832 AD, Caliph al-Ma'mūn bolstered the famous House of Wisdom. There the methods of Gondishapur were emulated; indeed, the House of Wisdom was staffed with graduates of the older Academy of Gondishapur.

However, by that time the intellectual center of the Abbasid Caliphate had definitively shifted to Baghdad, as henceforth there are few references in contemporary literature to universities or hospitals at Gondishapur. The significance of the center gradually declined. Al-Muqaddasi's Best Divisions for Knowledge of the Regions (c. 1000 AD) described Gondishapur as falling into ruins. The last known head of Gundeshapur's hospital died in 869 AD.

=== Modern university ===
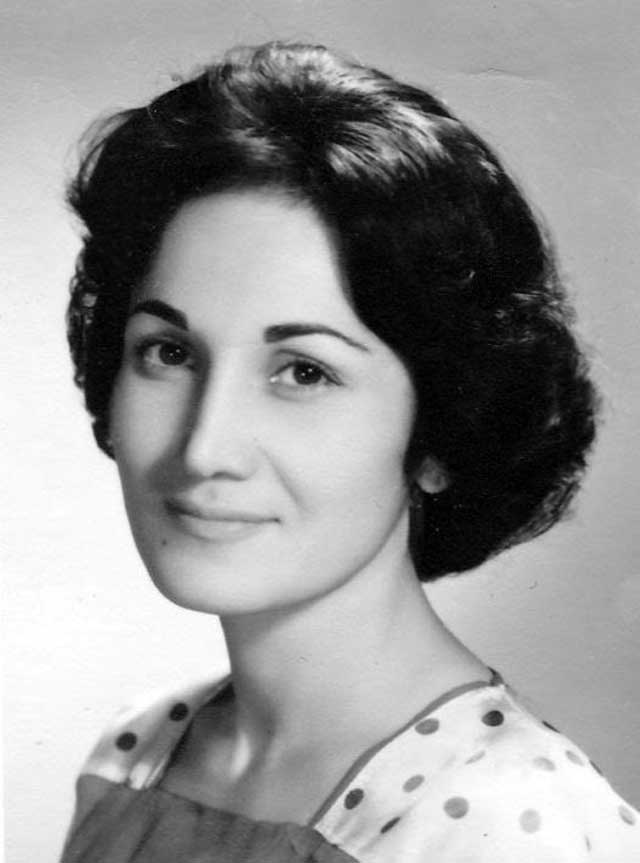
Talat Basari was appointed vice chancellor of the university, the first woman to reach such a post in any Iranian university.

Under the Pahlavi dynasty, the heritage of Gondishapur was memorialized by the founding of the Jondishapur University and its twin institution Jondishapur University of Medical Sciences, near the city of Ahvaz in 1955.

The latter-day Jondishapur University of Medical Sciences was founded and named after its Sassanid predecessor, by its founder and first Chancellor, Dr. Mohammad Kar, Father of Cyrus Kar, in Ahvaz in 1959.

The first woman to be appointed as vice-chancellor in a university in Iran, Dr. Tal'at Basari, was appointed at this university in the mid-1960s, and starting 1968, plans for the modern campus were designed by architect Kamran Diba.

Ancient Gondeshapur was also slated for an archaeological investigation. Experts from the Archaeological Research Center of Iran's Cultural Heritage Organization and the Oriental Institute of the University of Chicago planned to start excavations in early 2006.

== Significance ==
[T]o a very large extent, the credit for the whole hospital system must be given to Persia.

— Cyril Elgood, A Medical History of Persia

In addition to systemizing medical treatment and knowledge, the scholars of the academy also transformed medical education; rather than apprenticing with just one physician, medical students were required to work in the hospital under the supervision of the whole medical faculty. There is even evidence that graduates had to pass exams in order to practice as accredited Gondishapur physicians (as recorded in an Arabic text, the Tārīkh al-ḥukamā). While there are no extant records relating to mathematical activities in Gondishapur, it is probable that works on mathematics were translated there alongside texts from other disciplines.

== Notable physicians ==
- Borzūya
- Bukhtishu
- Masawaiyh
- Sarakhsi
- Sabur ibn Sahl
- Nafi ibn al-Harith

== Gallery ==
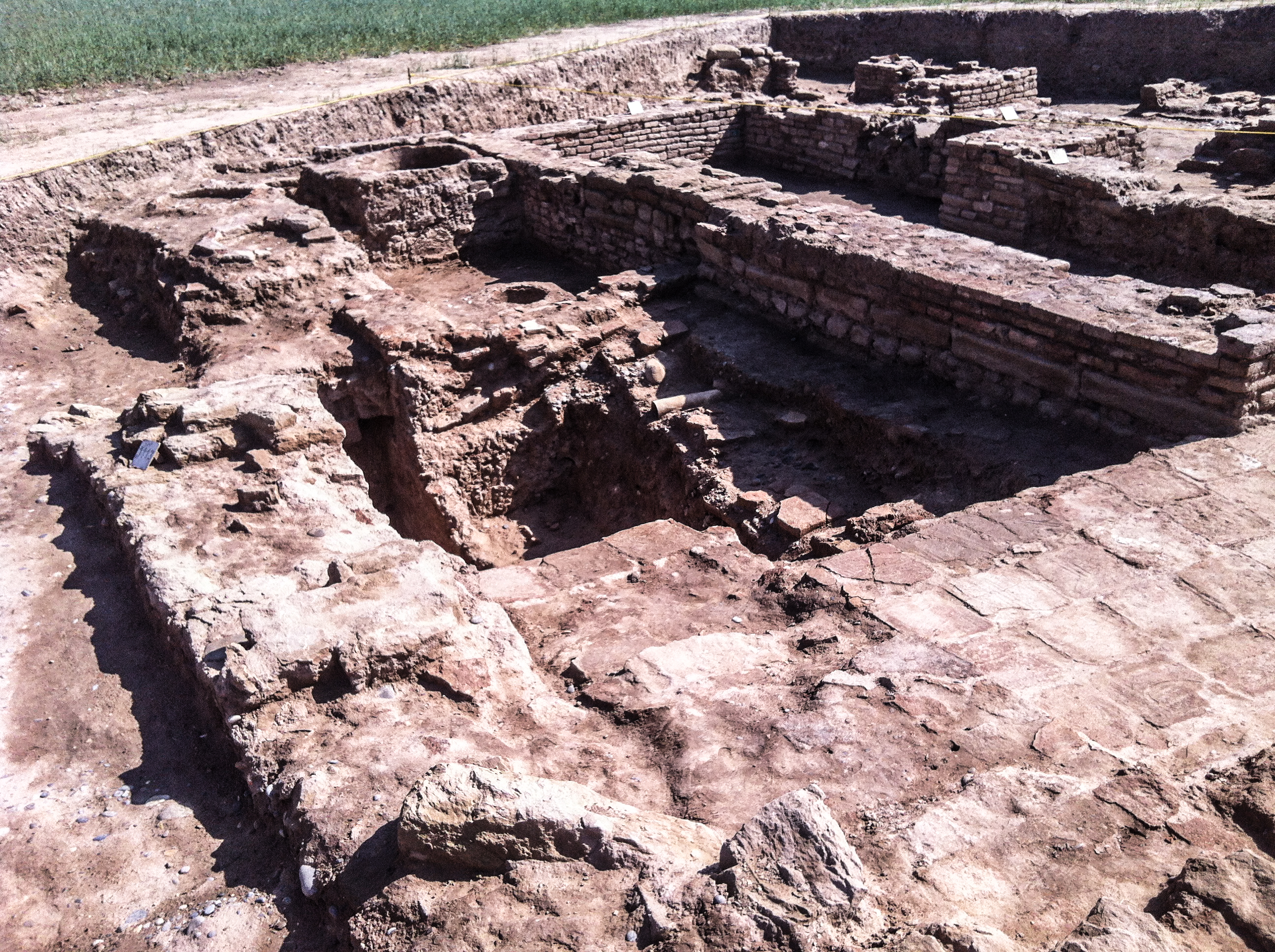

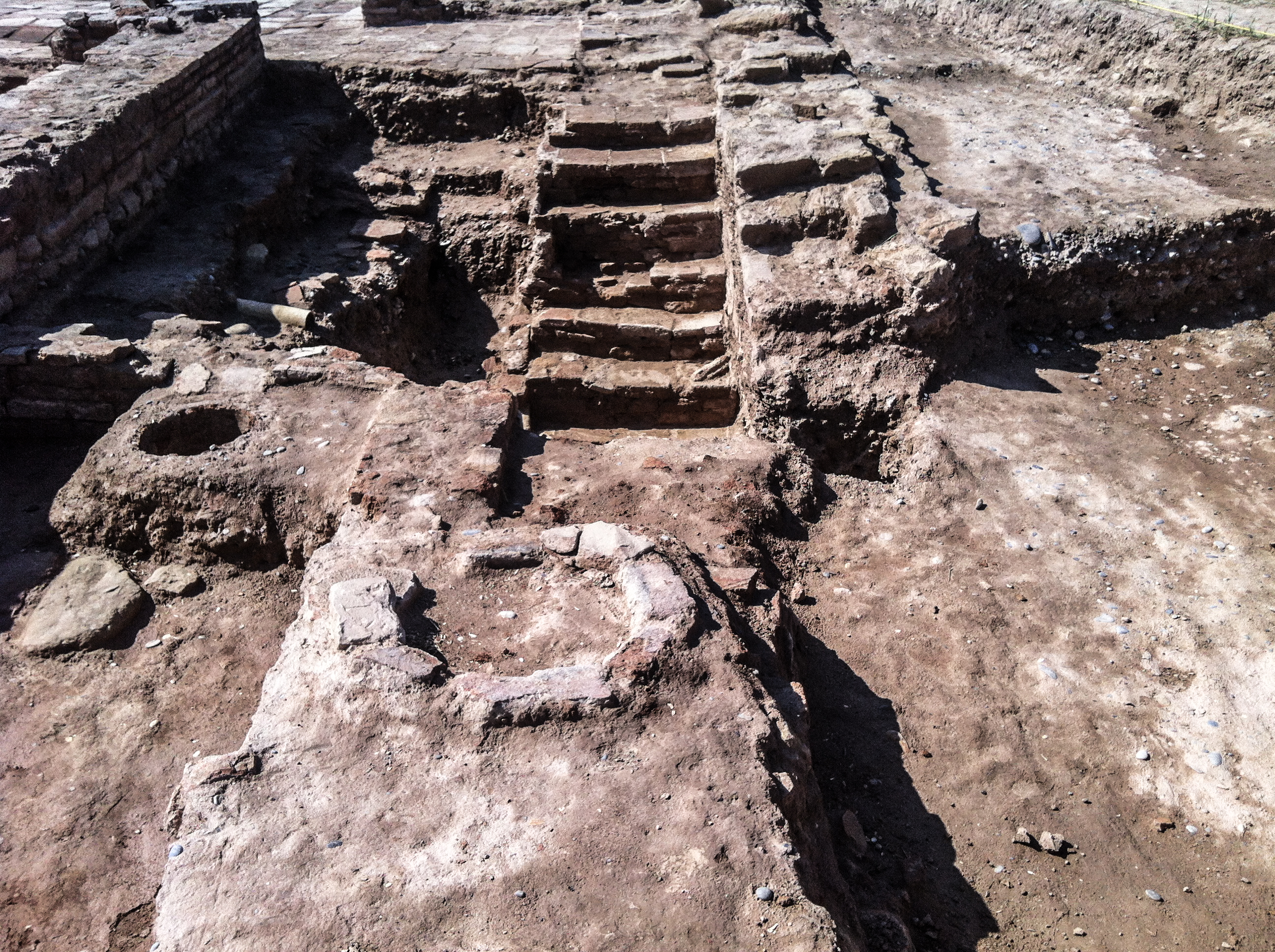

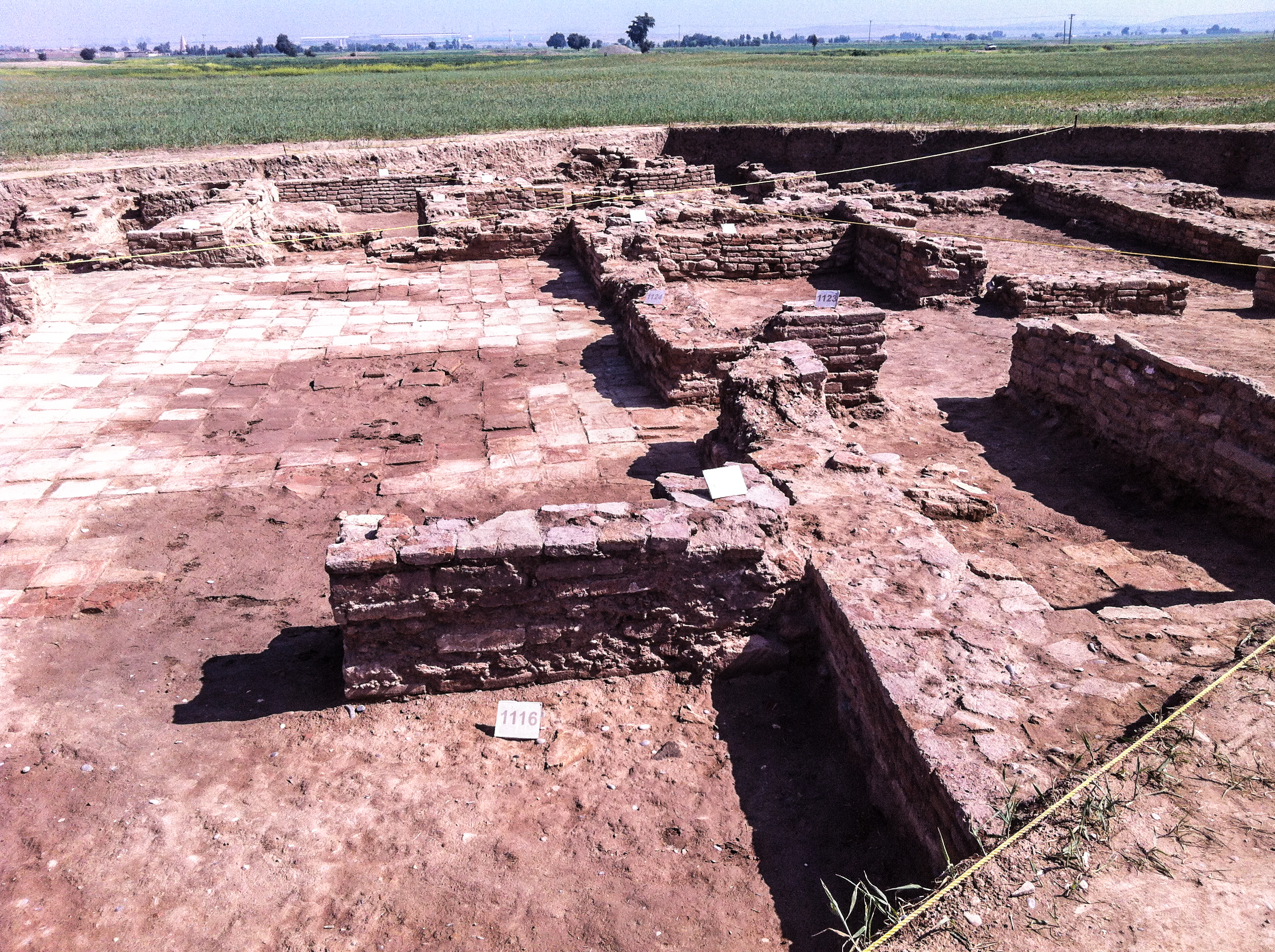

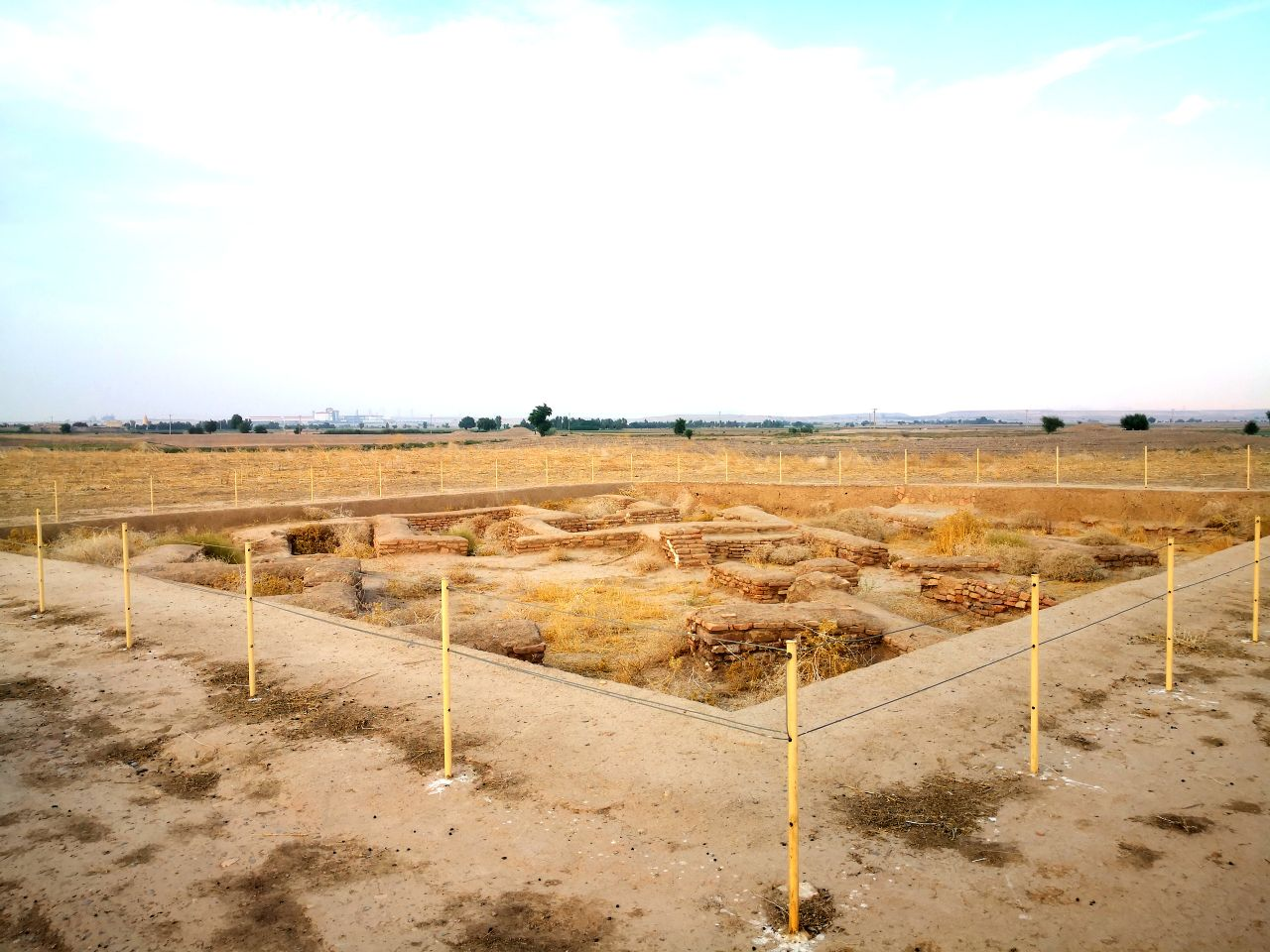

== See also ==
- Nizamiyya
