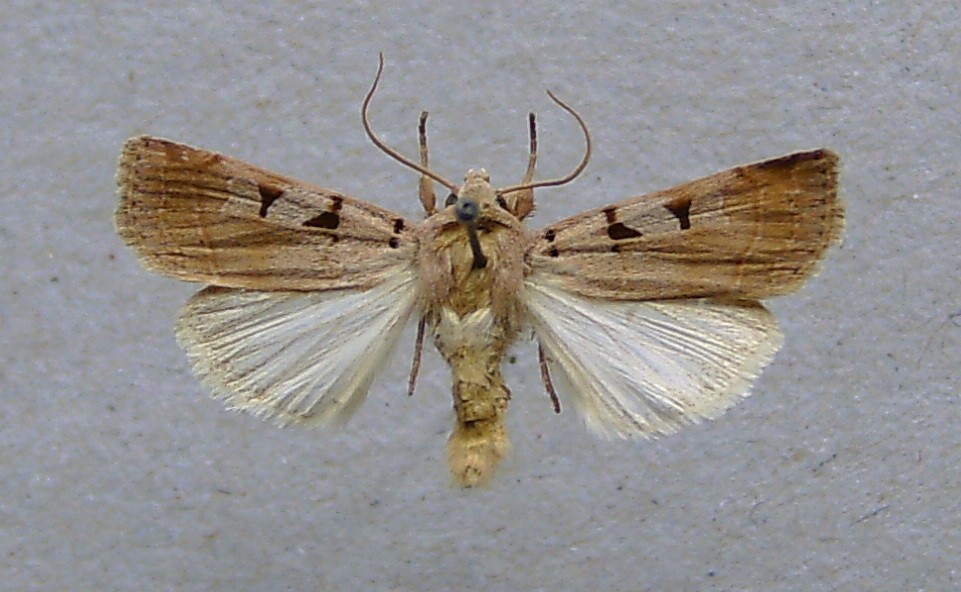

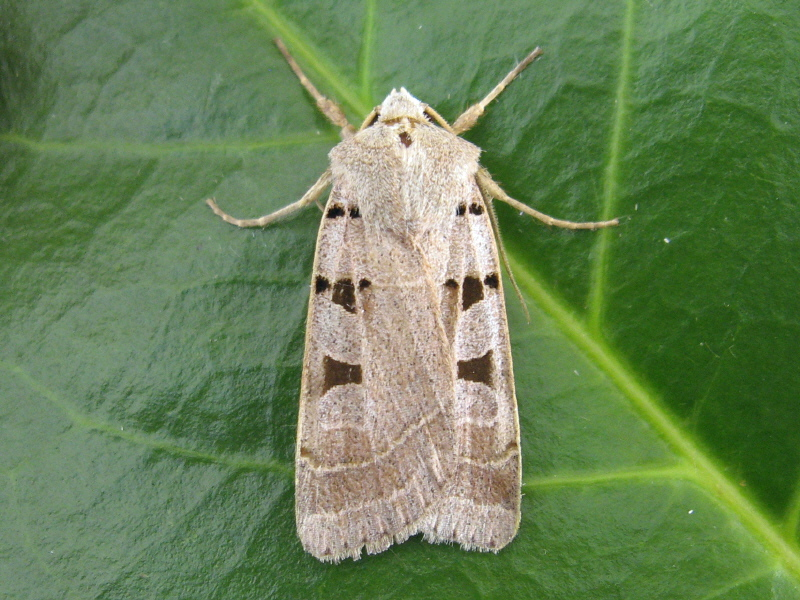

Scientific classification
- Domain: Eukaryota
- Kingdom: Animalia
- Phylum: Arthropoda
- Class: Insecta
- Order: Lepidoptera
- Superfamily: Noctuoidea
- Family: Noctuidae
- Genus: Eugnorisma
- Species: E. glareosa

Binomial name
- Eugnorisma glareosa (Esper, 1788)

= Autumnal rustic =

Species of moth

The autumnal rustic (Eugnorisma glareosa) is a moth of the family Noctuidae. The species was first described by Eugenius Johann Christoph Esper in 1788. It was previously placed in the genus Paradiarsia. It is found in northern and western Europe and North Africa.

== Description ==
The forewings are usually pale grey, distinctively marked with a row of three angular black marks. The ground colour, however, is quite variable with pinkish or reddish forms occurring fairly frequently. In the north of Scotland, including Orkney and Shetland, an almost black form occurs (some authorities regard this as a subspecies, E. g. edda). The hindwings of the typical forms are white, grey in the darker forms. The wingspan is 32–38 mm.

== Technical description and variation ==
Forewing pearly grey, with fine dark dusting; cell before and beyond orbicular stigma velvety black brown; subbasal and inner lines marked each by a black spot on costa and another below median vein; outer and submarginal lines pale; hindwing whitish, dusted with grey, especially in female - the form edda Stgr. occurring in the Shetland Islands is dark, with forewing red brown and the hindwing dark brown; — rosea Tutt is lilac grey suffused with rosy; - limbata Gouin, from the Gironde in France, has the forewing tinged with bluish green, and the marginal area darker than usual.

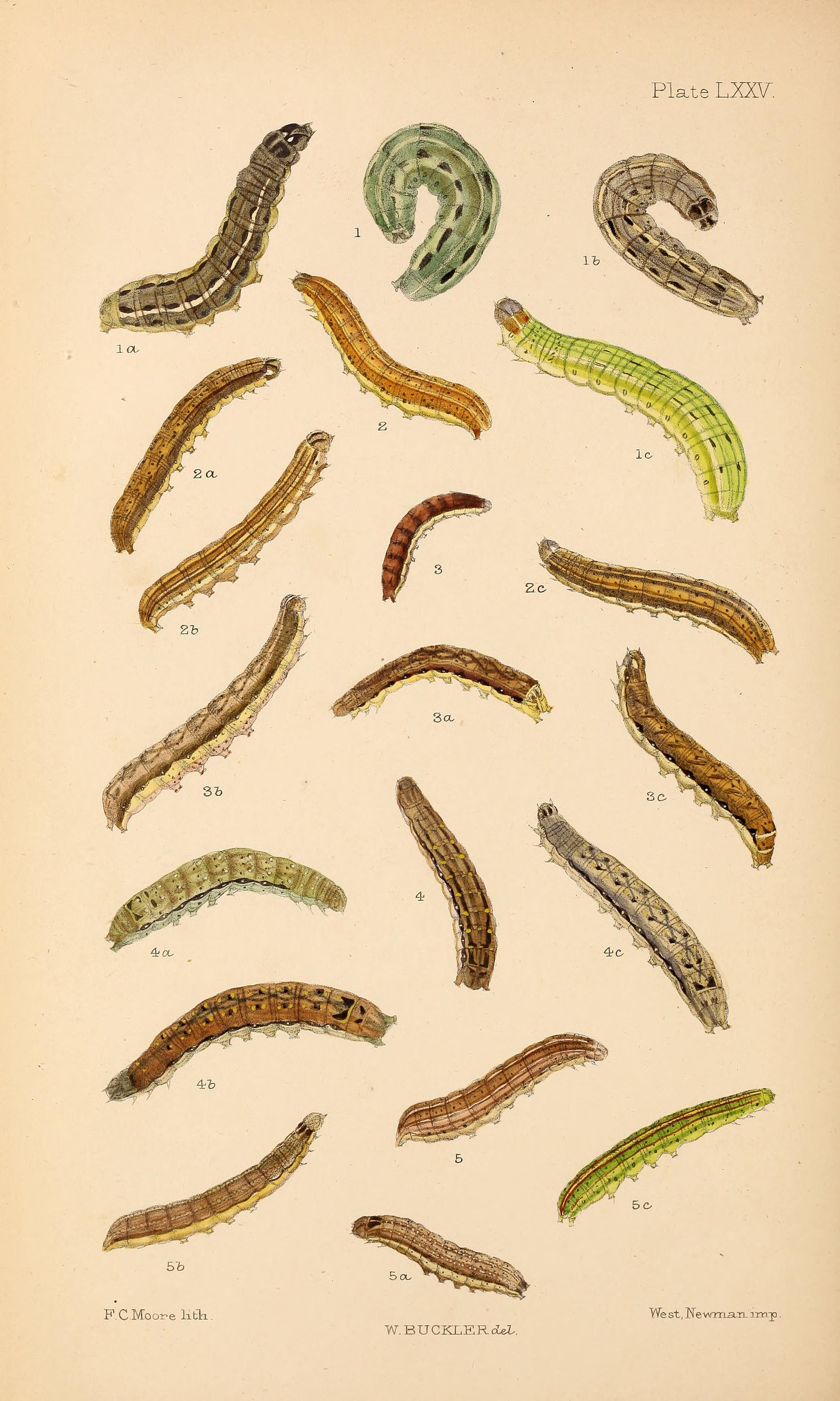
2,2a,2b,2c larva after last moult

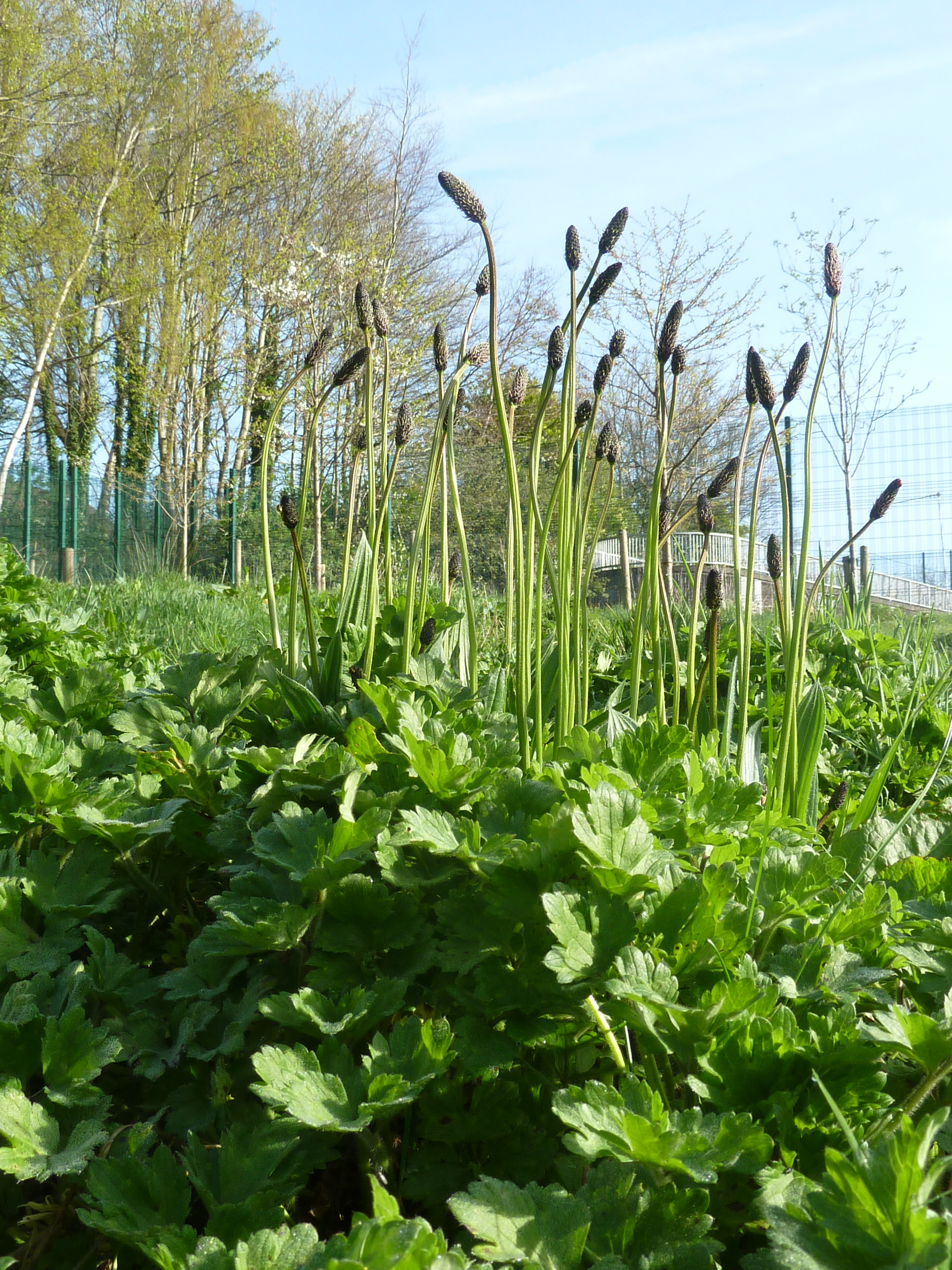
Habitat, Ireland

== Biology ==
This species flies from the latter half of August to the first half of September and is attracted to light and heather flowers. Larva pale brown, darker along the sides; the dorsal and subdorsal lines pale, dark edged; spiracular line ochreous yellow. The larva feeds on a range of plants: It has been recorded on bedstraws, docks, hawkweeds, heather, lettuce, plantains and willows as well as grasses such as Poa. This species overwinters as a very small larva.

== Distribution ==
Eugnorisma glareosum is a species with an Atlantic-Mediterranean distribution, which occurs from Morocco and the Iberian Peninsula, through western and central Europe to the British Isles, southern Norway, southern Sweden, Poland and Estonia. It has expanded to the east in the last century.
