= Shahid Chamran University of Ahvaz =

Public university in Ahvaz, Iran

- دانشگاه شهید چمران اهواز; Dāneshgāh-e Shahid Chamrān-e Ahvāz
- Main gate of Shahid Chamran University of Ahvaz
- Former names: Gondishapur University of Ahvaz; Jundishapur University of Ahvaz (1955–1982)
- Type: Public
- Established: 1955; 71 years ago (Note: The university's own pages are inconsistent about the founding year: its "About" page gives 1332 SH (1953/54), while its history page and most external sources give Mehr 1334 (September 1955), when the Faculty of Agriculture admitted its first students.)
- Founder: Mohammad Reza Pahlavi
- Affiliations: Ministry of Science, Research and Technology
- President: Ali-Hossein Hosseinzadeh (acting)
- Academic staff: 642 (2025)
- Students: 20,373 (2013)
- Undergraduates: 15,088 (2013)
- Postgraduates: 5,285 (2013)
- Location: Golestan Boulevard, Ahvaz, Khuzestan, Iran; 31.310046°N 48.659283°E
- Campus: 112 hectares (280 acres); Urban; two main campuses in Ahvaz and five dependent campuses elsewhere in the province
- Colors: Blue and orange
- Website: scu.ac.ir

Shahid Chamran University of Ahvaz (Persian: دانشگاه شهید چمران اهواز), formerly the Jundishapur University of Ahvaz (also spelled Gundishapur or Jondishapur), is a public university in Ahvaz, Khuzestan, Iran. Opened in 1955, it is one of Iran's comprehensive "Grade A" (sath-e yek) universities as designated by the Ministry of Science, Research and Technology, and comprises 15 faculties together with one satellite campus. Its name commemorates the Academy of Gondishapur, the late antique centre of learning in Khuzestan.

By the ISC ranking, Shahid Chamran University of Ahvaz was the 13th largest and a leading university in Iran in 2015. The campus covers 276 acres (112 ha).

In 2024 (1403 SH), at the 41st meeting of the presidents of Iran's Grade A universities, attended by the Minister of Science, Research and Technology Hossein Simaei Sarraf, the ministry granted the university an "international mission" (ma'muriyat-e beynolmelali), placing it among the fifteen Iranian universities designated as leading, policy-shaping institutions.

== History ==
=== Ancient Jundishapur ===
The university takes its historical name from Jundishapur, a city whose foundation is traditionally attributed to the Sasanian king Shapur I. Over roughly six centuries the name became synonymous with a major centre of learning in a range of disciplines, reaching its height under Khosrow I Anushirvan in the 6th century.

The exact site of the ancient university city is not established with certainty. According to research by Ahmad Eghtedari, it most probably lay in the area bounded by Shushtar, Susa and Dezful. The village of Shahabad, some 18 kilometres (11 mi) south-east of Dezful and 50 kilometres (31 mi) north-west of Shushtar, is one of the proposed locations.

=== Modern foundation ===
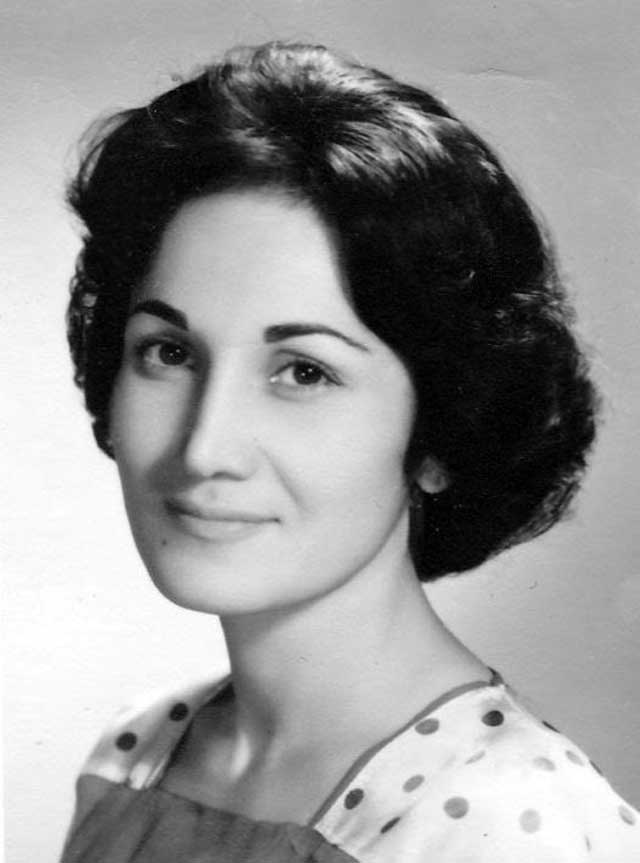
Shortly after the modern university opened, Talat Basari was appointed vice-president, becoming the first woman to hold such a post at an Iranian university.

The modern institution opened in Ahvaz in Mehr 1334 (September 1955) under the name Gondishapur; shortly afterwards the spelling was changed to Jundishapur. Its buildings were laid out beside the Karun River, adjoining the Ahvaz tropical botanical garden. Several of the buildings and faculties were designed by architects including Kamran Diba and André Godard, making the complex one of the more notable examples of modern campus architecture in Iran.

The Faculty of Agriculture was the first faculty to be established, and agriculture, literature, mathematics and medicine were among the first fields of study offered. On 15 June 1958 (25 Khordad 1337) the first cohort of 38 graduates of the Faculty of Agriculture received their degrees.

Shortly after the university opened, Talat Basari was appointed vice-president, the first woman to reach such a position at a university in Iran.

=== Renaming ===
During the Iran–Iraq War, parts of the university's grounds were assigned to Mostafa Chamran, head of the Headquarters of Irregular Warfare. Following his death in action in 1981, the university was renamed in 1982 from Jundishapur University of Ahvaz to Shahid Chamran University of Ahvaz in his memory.

=== Separation of the medical faculties ===
In 1986, under national legislation transferring medical education to the newly created Ministry of Health and Medical Education, the Schools of Medicine, Health, Dentistry, Nursing and Pharmacy separated from the university to form the independent Ahvaz Jundishapur University of Medical Sciences.

== Organisation ==
The university is administered through the following vice-presidencies (mo'avenat):

- Cultural and Social Affairs
- Research and Technology
- Education and Graduate Studies
- Administration and Support
- Student Affairs

== Faculties ==
- Faculty of Sciences:
  - Department of Physics
  - Department of Chemistry
  - Department of Biology
  - Department of Genetics
- Faculty of Engineering:
  - Department of Electrical Engineering
  - Department of Mechanical Engineering
  - Department of Computer Engineering
  - Department of Civil Engineering
  - Department of Metallurgical Engineering
  - Department of Architecture
- Faculty of Literature and Humanities:
  - Department of Persian Language
  - Department of English Language
  - Department of French Language
  - Department of History
- Faculty of Agriculture:
  - Department of Agronomy
  - Department of Agricultural Machinery
  - Department of Horticulture
  - Department of Plant Protection
  - Department of Soil Science
- Faculty of Veterinary Medicine:
  - Department of Basic Sciences
  - Department of Pathology
  - Department of Hygiene
  - Department of Clinical Sciences
- Faculty of Physical Education
- Faculty of Education and Psychology:
  - Department of Education
  - Department of Psychology
  - Department of Library and Information Science
- Faculty of Mathematics and Statistics:
  - Department of Mathematical Science
  - Department of Computer Science
  - Department of Statistics
- Faculty of Water Sciences Engineering:
  - Department of Hydrology
  - Department of Water Structures Engineering
  - Department of Irrigation and Drainage
  - Department of Civil and Environmental Engineering
- Shushtar Faculty of Education
- Faculty of Theology and Islamic Thought
- Faculty of Economics and Social Sciences:
  - Department of Economics
  - Department of Business Administration
  - Department of Accounting
  - Department of Social Sciences
  - Department of Law
  - Department of Political Science

== See also ==
- Higher education in Iran
- List of universities in Iran
