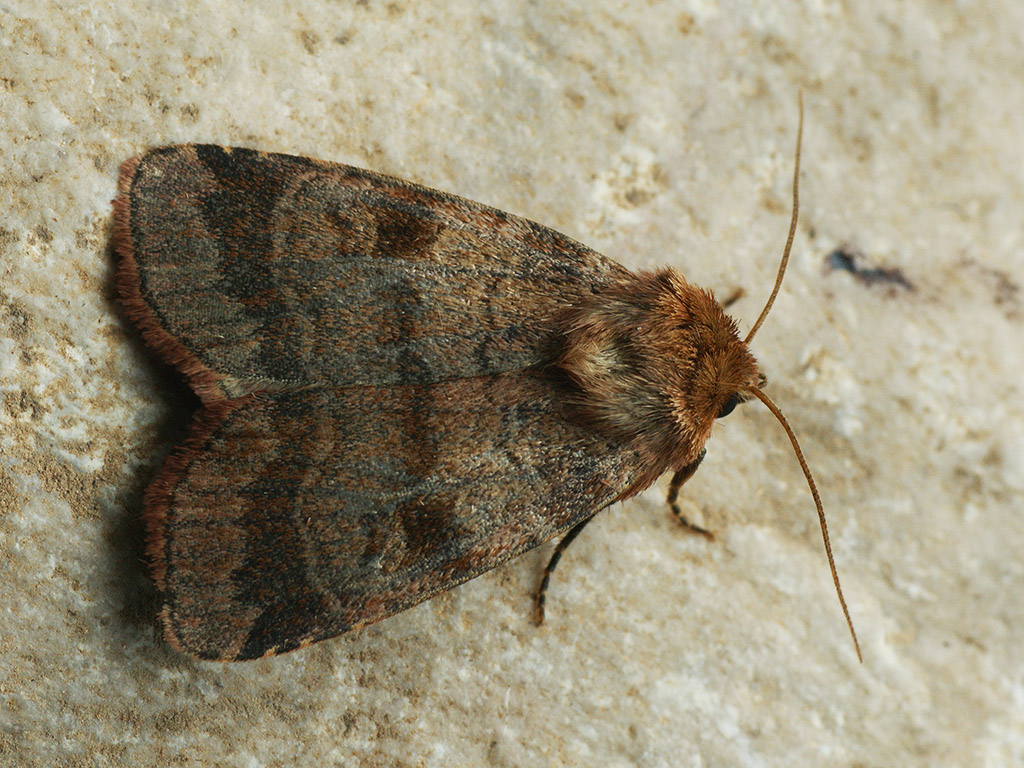

Scientific classification
- Kingdom: Animalia
- Phylum: Arthropoda
- Clade: Pancrustacea
- Class: Insecta
- Order: Lepidoptera
- Superfamily: Noctuoidea
- Family: Noctuidae
- Genus: Paradiarsia
- Species: P. punicea

Binomial name
- Paradiarsia punicea (Hübner, 1803)

= Paradiarsia punicea =

Species of moth

Paradiarsia punicea is a moth belonging to the family Noctuidae. The species was first described by Jacob Hübner in 1803.

It is native to Eurasia.
