= Goniographa gyulaipeteri =

Scientific classification
- Domain: Eukaryota
- Kingdom: Animalia
- Phylum: Arthropoda
- Class: Insecta
- Order: Lepidoptera
- Superfamily: Noctuoidea
- Family: Noctuidae
- Genus: Goniographa
- Species: G. gyulaipeteri

Binomial name
- Goniographa gyulaipeteri Varga & Ronkay, 2002

Species of moth

Goniographa gyulaipeteri is a moth of the family Noctuidae. It is widely distributed in the western Tien-Shan Mountains, in the Hissar and Alai Mountains, in the western Pamirs (Shugnan Range) and also in north-eastern Afghanistan (Badakhshan).
