= Eugnorisma pontica =

Scientific classification
- Domain: Eukaryota
- Kingdom: Animalia
- Phylum: Arthropoda
- Class: Insecta
- Order: Lepidoptera
- Superfamily: Noctuoidea
- Family: Noctuidae
- Genus: Eugnorisma
- Species: E. pontica

Binomial name
- Eugnorisma pontica (Staudinger, 1892)

Synonyms
- Agrotis depuncta var. pontica Staudinger, 1891

Species of moth

Eugnorisma pontica is a moth of the family Noctuidae. It is found in the Balkans and in parts of Near East and Middle East, including Israel.

Adults are on wing in October. There is one generation per year.

Larvae have been reared on various low growing plants.
