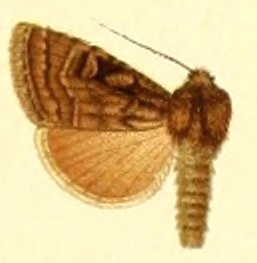

Scientific classification
- Domain: Eukaryota
- Kingdom: Animalia
- Phylum: Arthropoda
- Class: Insecta
- Order: Lepidoptera
- Superfamily: Noctuoidea
- Family: Noctuidae
- Genus: Goniographa
- Species: G. marcida

Binomial name
- Goniographa marcida (Christoph, 1893)

Synonyms
- Eugraphe marcida (Christoph, 1893); Agrotis marcida Christoph, 1893; Euxoa marcida (Christoph, 1893)

= Goniographa marcida =

Species of moth

Goniographa marcida is a moth of the family Noctuidae. It is found endemic to the Kopet-Dagh mountain system in Turkmenistan and Iran.

The wingspan is 27–35 mm.
