= Goniographa discussa =

Scientific classification
- Domain: Eukaryota
- Kingdom: Animalia
- Phylum: Arthropoda
- Class: Insecta
- Order: Lepidoptera
- Superfamily: Noctuoidea
- Family: Noctuidae
- Genus: Goniographa
- Species: G. discussa

Binomial name
- Goniographa discussa Varga & Ronkay, 2002

Species of moth

Goniographa discussa is a moth of the family Noctuidae. It is found from the Zeravshan Mountains and Hissar Mountains through the western Pamirs to north-eastern Afghanistan (Badakhshan).

The wingspan is 30–35 mm.
