= Goniographa naumanni =

Scientific classification
- Domain: Eukaryota
- Kingdom: Animalia
- Phylum: Arthropoda
- Class: Insecta
- Order: Lepidoptera
- Superfamily: Noctuoidea
- Family: Noctuidae
- Genus: Goniographa
- Species: G. naumanni

Binomial name
- Goniographa naumanni Varga & Ronkay, 2002

Species of moth

Goniographa naumanni is a moth of the family Noctuidae. It is confined to the Hissar Mountains, the western Pamirs (Shugnan Range, Chorog) and the north-eastern territories of Afghanistan (Badakhshan, Kadaghan and the Darwaz Mountains).

The wingspan is 32–37 mm.
