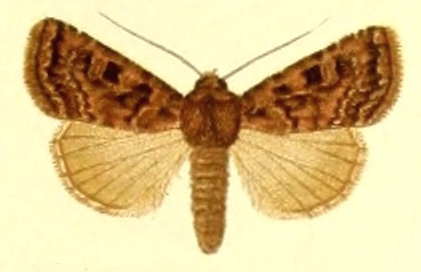
- Goniographa decussa

Scientific classification
- Domain: Eukaryota
- Kingdom: Animalia
- Phylum: Arthropoda
- Class: Insecta
- Order: Lepidoptera
- Superfamily: Noctuoidea
- Family: Noctuidae
- Genus: Goniographa
- Species: G. decussa

Binomial name
- Goniographa decussa (Staudinger, 1897)

Synonyms
- Agrotis decussa Staudinger, 1897

= Goniographa decussa =

Species of moth

Goniographa decussa is a moth of the family Noctuidae. It is found in the western Tien-Shan Mountains.

The wingspan is 27–34 mm.
