= Goniographa metafunkei =

Scientific classification
- Domain: Eukaryota
- Kingdom: Animalia
- Phylum: Arthropoda
- Class: Insecta
- Order: Lepidoptera
- Superfamily: Noctuoidea
- Family: Noctuidae
- Genus: Goniographa
- Species: G. metafunkei

Binomial name
- Goniographa metafunkei Varga & Ronkay, 2002

Species of moth

Goniographa metafunkei is a moth of the family Noctuidae. It has a strictly limited distribution in the western part of the Tien-Shan Mountains and the Alai Mountains.

The wingspan is 30–35 mm.
