= Paradiarsia littoralis =

Scientific classification
- Kingdom: Animalia
- Phylum: Arthropoda
- Clade: Pancrustacea
- Class: Insecta
- Order: Lepidoptera
- Superfamily: Noctuoidea
- Family: Noctuidae
- Genus: Paradiarsia
- Species: P. littoralis

Binomial name
- Paradiarsia littoralis (Packard, 1867)

Synonyms
- Paradiarsia littoralis pectinata (Grote, 1874)

Species of moth

Paradiarsia littoralis, the Labrador dart moth, is a species of cutworm or dart moth in the family Noctuidae. It is found in North America.

The MONA or Hodges number for Paradiarsia littoralis is 10992.
