= Soudabeh =

Soudabeh or Sudabeh is an Iranian feminine given name. Notable people with the name include:

== Given name ==
- Soudabeh Babagap, Iranian documentary filmmaker, poet, and painter
- Soudabeh Bagherpour (born 1990), Iranian volleyball player
- Soudabeh Beizaee (born 1981), Iranian actress
- Soudabeh Fazaeli (born 1947), Iranian author, researcher and translator
- Soudabeh Moradian (born 1972), Iranian filmmaker
- Sudabeh Mohafez (born 1963), Iranian-German author
- Sudabeh Mortezai (born 1968), Austrian–Iranian filmmaker

== Fictional characters ==
- Soudabeh Abadi (Alchemist), a mutant character in Marvel Comics
