= Coenophila opacifrons =

Scientific classification
- Kingdom: Animalia
- Phylum: Arthropoda
- Class: Insecta
- Order: Lepidoptera
- Superfamily: Noctuoidea
- Family: Noctuidae
- Genus: Coenophila
- Species: C. opacifrons

Binomial name
- Coenophila opacifrons (Grote, 1878)

Synonyms
- Agrotis opacifrons Grote, 1878; Eugraphe subrosea opacifrons; Coenophila opacifrons; Semiophora opacifrons (Grote, 1878); Graphiphora opacifrons (Grote, 1878); Anomogyna opacifrons (Grote, 1878)

Species of moth

Coenophila opacifrons, the blueberry dart or plain-faced blueberry dart, is a moth of the family Noctuidae. The species was first described by Augustus Radcliffe Grote in 1878. It is found in North America from Labrador and Newfoundland, south to New Jersey, west across the boreal forest to eastern British Columbia, south in the mountains to southern Montana.

The wingspan is 32–38 mm. Adults are on wing from July to August. There is one generation per year.

The larvae feed on Chamaedaphne calyculata, Vaccinium and Myrica gale.
