= Irregular Warfare Headquarters =

- Active: Since 2 October 1979 (first operation)
- Disbanded: c. 1982
- Country: Iran
- Branch: Iranian Armed Forces
- Type: Irregular military
- Role: Guerrilla warfare
- Size: ≈ 3,000
- Garrison/HQ: Ahvaz
- Engagements: Iran–Iraq War

Commanders
- Notable commanders: Mostafa Chamran; Mehdi Chamran

Irregular Warfare Headquarters (Persian: ستاد جنگ‌های نامنظم) was an Irregular military unit of Iranian Armed Forces, active during Iran–Iraq War. The unit was established by Mostafa Chamran in 1979. After his death in 1981, Mehdi Chamran became commander of the unit for about nine months and it eventually was dissolved. Guerrillas fighting in this unit later joined Islamic Revolutionary Guard Corps and Basij.
