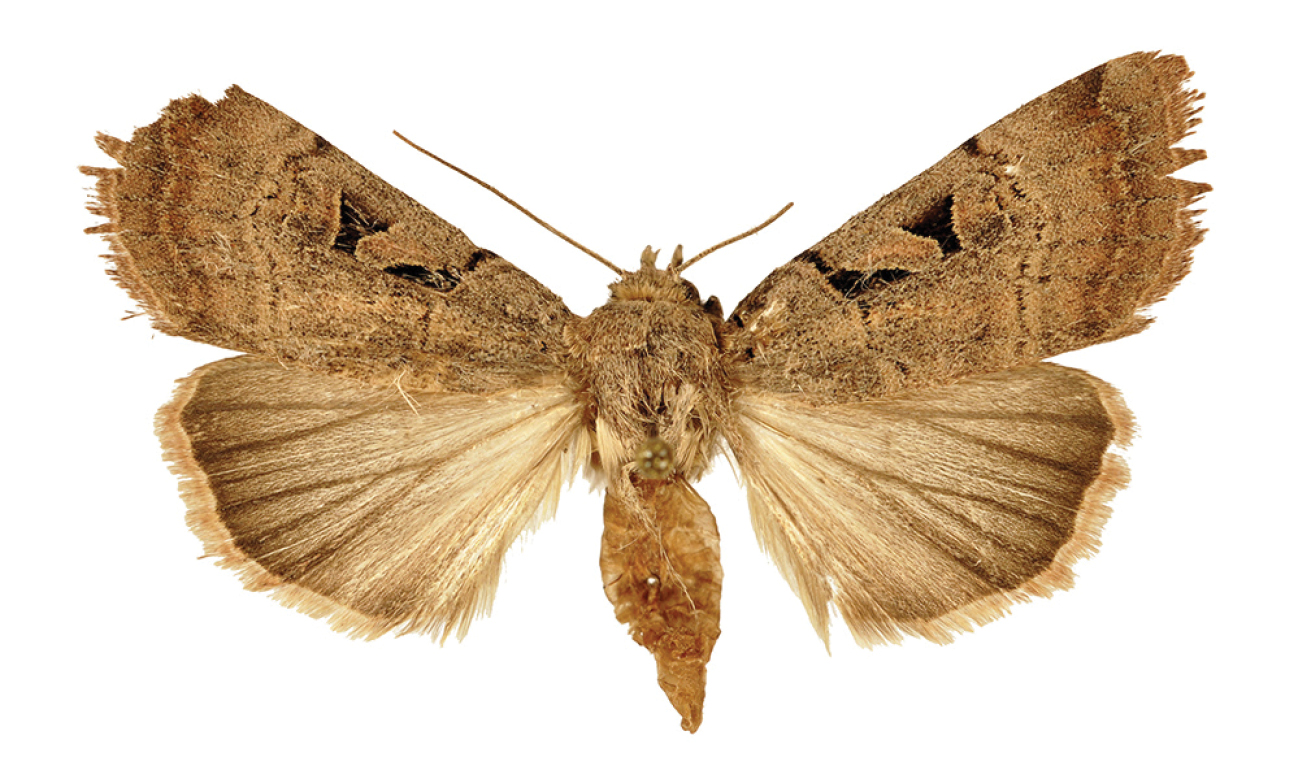
- Female
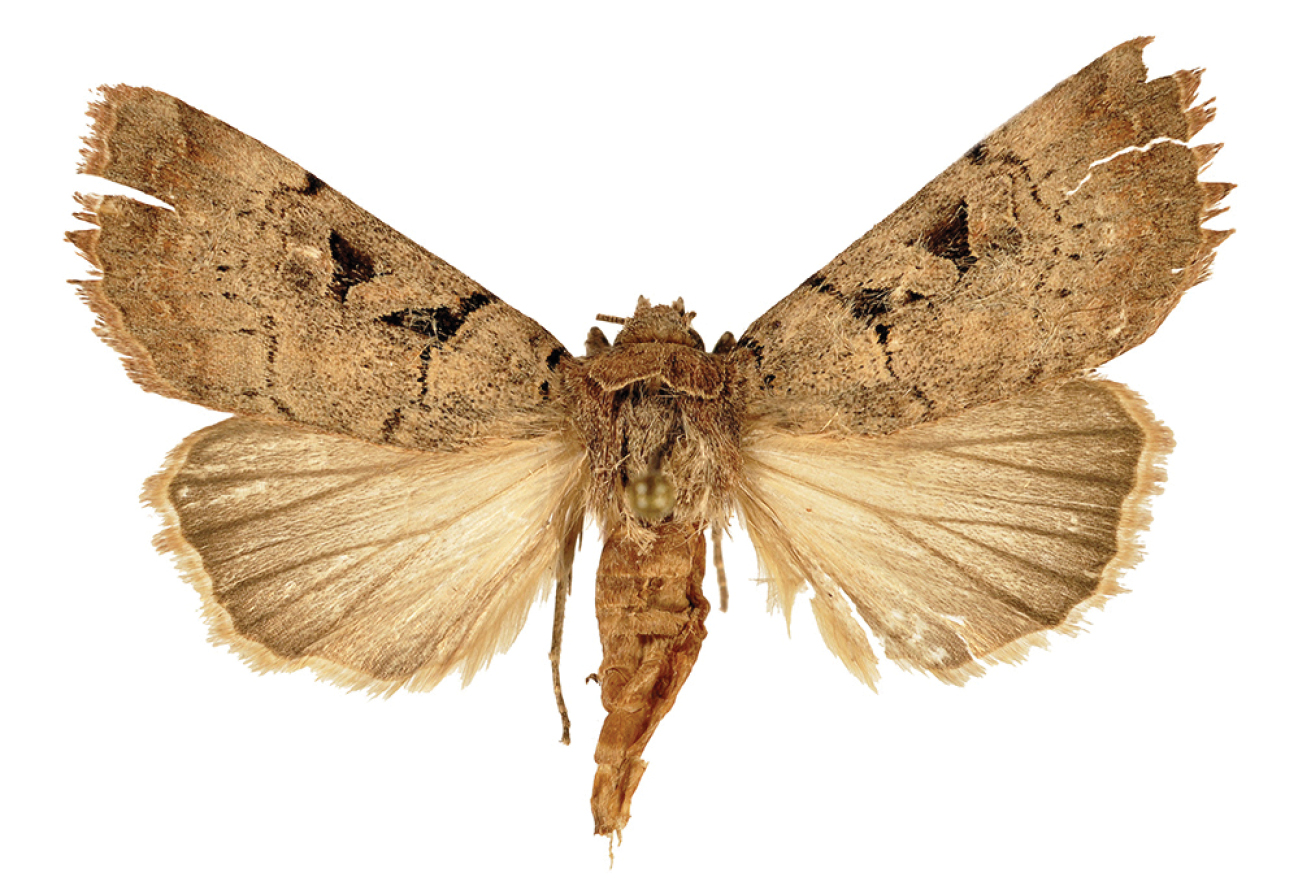
- Male

Scientific classification
- Domain: Eukaryota
- Kingdom: Animalia
- Phylum: Arthropoda
- Class: Insecta
- Order: Lepidoptera
- Superfamily: Noctuoidea
- Family: Noctuidae
- Genus: Anagnorisma
- Species: A. chamrani

Binomial name
- Anagnorisma chamrani Gyulai, Rabieh, Seraj, Ronkay & Esfandiari, 2013

= Anagnorisma chamrani =

Species of moth

Anagnorisma chamrani is a moth in the family Noctuidae. It was found in the Binaloud Mountains of the Razavi Khorasan Province in north-eastern Iran in 2012.

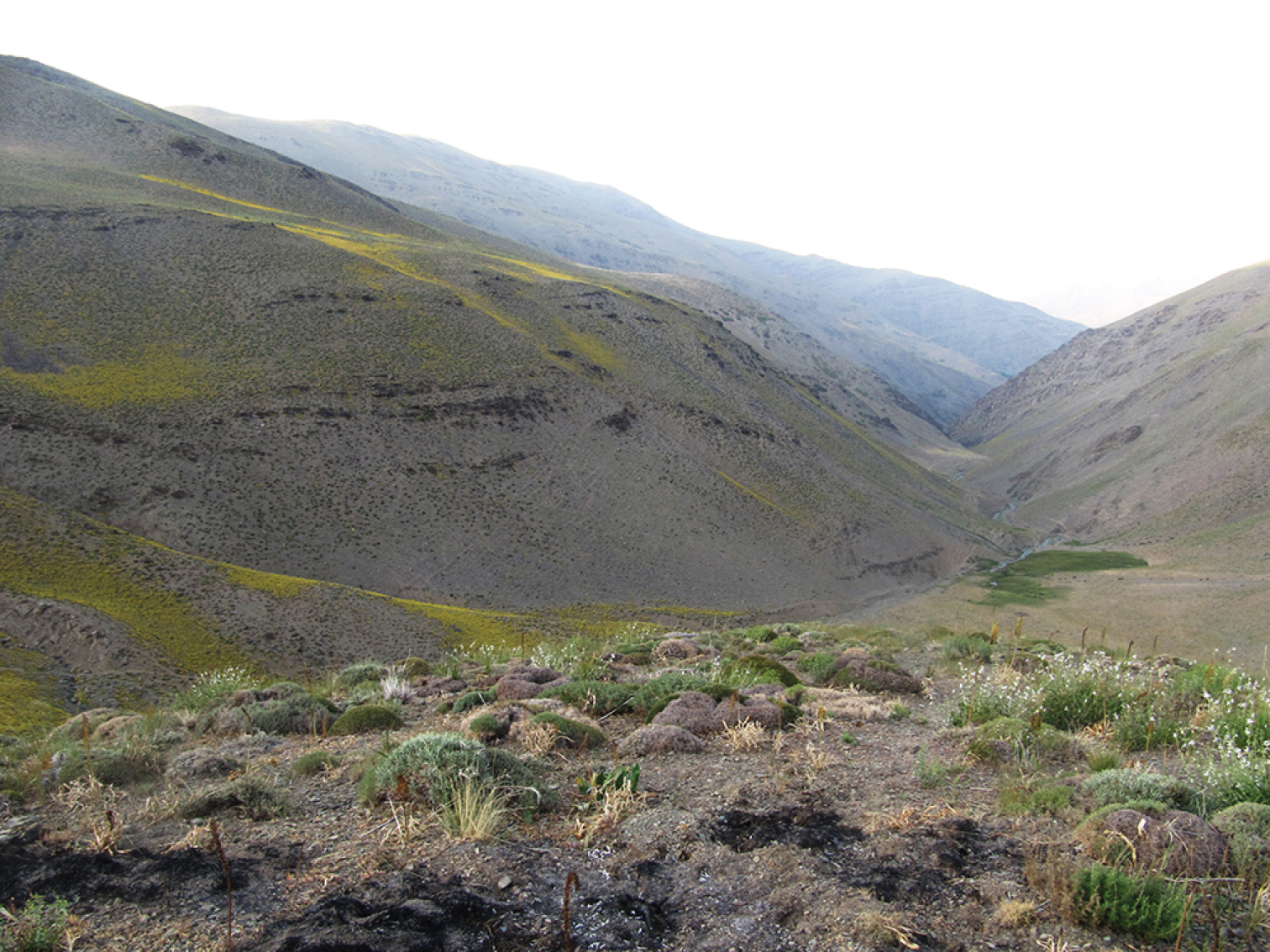
Habitat

== Etymology ==
The species is named in honour of Mostafa Chamran (1932–1981).

== Specifics ==
The species has a wingspan of 34–35 mm. The wing pattern, external and genitalia characteristics of the species are very similar to those of A. eucratides, which has been found only in eastern Afghanistan at altitudes of 2050 to 2450 m of the Hindu Kush Mountains. Based on biological and geographical closeness, these two species are described as sisters.
