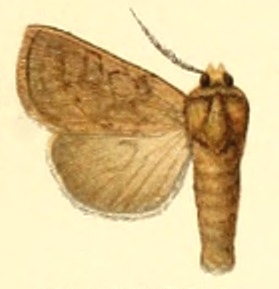

Scientific classification
- Domain: Eukaryota
- Kingdom: Animalia
- Phylum: Arthropoda
- Class: Insecta
- Order: Lepidoptera
- Superfamily: Noctuoidea
- Family: Noctuidae
- Genus: Paradiarsia
- Species: P. coturnicola

Binomial name
- Paradiarsia coturnicola (Graeser, 1892)

Synonyms
- Agrotis coturnicola Graeser, 1892; Euxoa coturnicola (Graeser, 1892); Paradiarsia herzi (Christoph, 1893)

= Paradiarsia coturnicola =

Species of moth

Paradiarsia coturnicola is a moth of the family Noctuidae. It is found in the South Siberian Mountains, central Yakutia, the mountains of north-eastern Siberia, and the area of Russia north of the Russian Far East.
