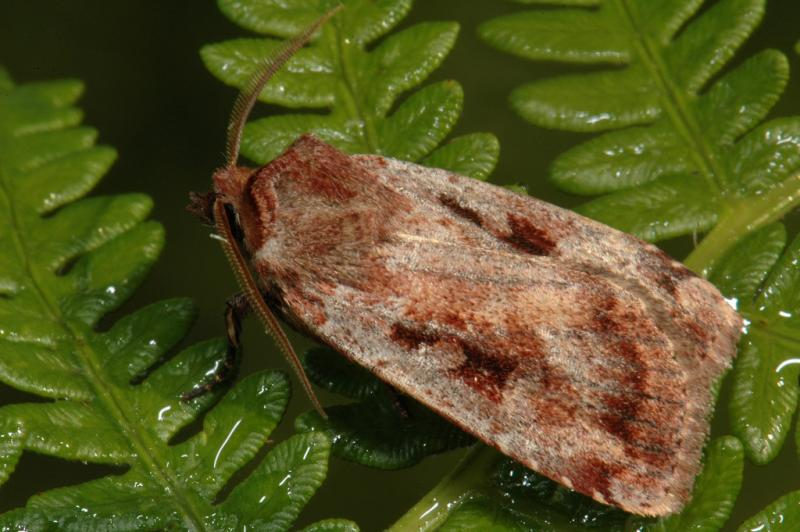

Scientific classification
- Kingdom: Animalia
- Phylum: Arthropoda
- Class: Insecta
- Order: Lepidoptera
- Superfamily: Noctuoidea
- Family: Noctuidae
- Genus: Coenophila
- Species: C. subrosea

Binomial name
- Coenophila subrosea (Stephens, 1829)

Synonyms
- Graphiphora subrosea Stephens, 1829; Graphiphora rhomboidea Stephens, 1829; Eugraphe subrosea Stephens

= Coenophila subrosea =

Species of moth

Coenophila subrosea, the rosy marsh moth, is a moth of the family Noctuidae. The species was first described by the English entomologist, James Francis Stephens in 1829, from a moth found at Whittlesea, Cambridgeshire, England. It is found in Asia and Europe.

== Description ==
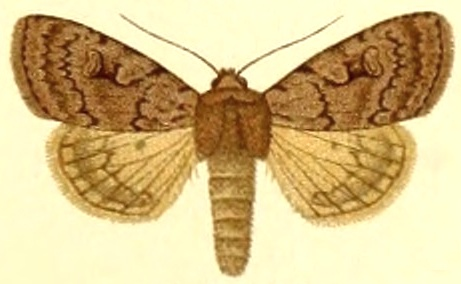

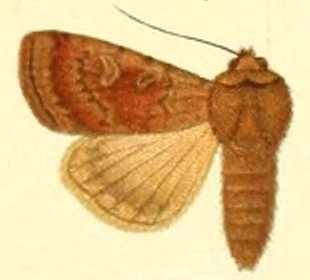

The wingspan is 35–41 mm (1.4–1.6 in).Warren (1914) states R. subrosea Stph. (= rhomboidea Stph. nec Esp.) (7 i). Forewing rufous grey, dusted with pale grey; stigmata large, pale grey; the cell rufous or red-brown; the claviform obsolete; hindwing greyish ochreous, with diffusely darker border; fringe ochreous. Typical subrosea Stph. occurred formerly within a restricted area in the fens of Britain, but is now extinct. The form subcoerulea Stgr. (7 k) which is bluer grey, is found in Sweden, Prussia, Russia and in Amurland. Larva reddish grey, with paler lines;the spiracular line brighter yellow; food plants Myrica, Gale'' and Salix.

The moth is univoltine, flies July and August and comes to light.

Ovum

The eggs are laid as singles or a few at a time. They are hemispherical with around 20 longitudinal ribs and hatch in around ten days.

Larvae

Fully fed, larvae are c. 40 mm long and can be found from late-August to mid-June, feeding at night and through the winter when conditions are mild. The larvae feed on dwarf birch (Betula nana), bog-myrtle (Myrica gale), heather (Calluna vulgaris), bog bilberry (Vaccinium uliginosum), bog-rosemary (Andromeda polifolia) and marsh rosemary (Rhododendron tomentosum). They drop to the ground if the foodplant is touched or vibrates.

Pupa

Pupation is in a loose, silken cocoon, spun almost vertically, in the debris of the bog or sphagnum. Emergence usually occurs in the evening by 22:00 hours.

== Distribution ==
It is found from Great Britain, Italy and France, through central Europe, north to Scandinavia, east to Russia, from Siberia to the Amur region, Ussuri and Sakhalin, south to northern China, east to Korea and northern Japan.

Listed as an endangered species in Great Britain it was known from the Cambridgeshire and Huntingdonshire fens in the 19th-century and believed extinct until found at two sites in mid-Wales in the 1960s (now known from five sites). In 2005 it was discovered in Cumbria, where it is known from two sites.

== Etymology ==
Stephen’s originally named the moth, Graphiphora subrosea from the type specimen found at Whittlesea, Cambridgeshire in 1829. Graphiphora was raised by the German actor and entomologist (lepidopterist), Ferdinand Ochsenheimer in 1816. Graphis is a style or stilus for writing on wax tablets and phoreō to carry; from the ‘dart’ or claviform stigma on the forewing. The moth is currently called Coenophila subrosea; the specific name is from rubricosus and refers to the ground colour of the forewing which is similar to the colour of red ochre..
