= Goniographa shchetkini =

Scientific classification
- Domain: Eukaryota
- Kingdom: Animalia
- Phylum: Arthropoda
- Class: Insecta
- Order: Lepidoptera
- Superfamily: Noctuoidea
- Family: Noctuidae
- Genus: Goniographa
- Species: G. shchetkini

Binomial name
- Goniographa shchetkini Varga & Ronkay, 2002

Species of moth

Goniographa shchetkini is a moth of the family Noctuidae. It is only known from a single location near the Liangar Glacier.

The wingspan is about 31 mm.
