= Borzuya =

Persian physician

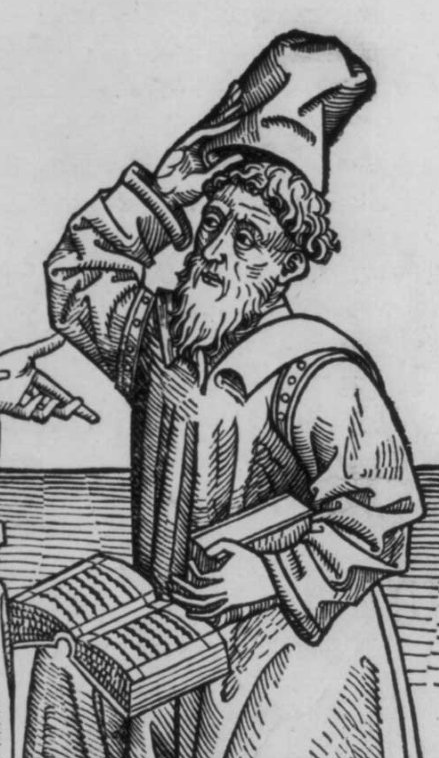
- Artwork of Borzūya
- Born: 5th century – 6th century Abarshahr or Merv
- Died: 6th century Sassanid Iran
- Education: Academy of Gondishapur (possibly)
- Known for: Translating many books into Pahlavi
- Medical career
- Profession: Physician

Borzuya (or Burzōē or Burzōy or Borzouyeh, Persian: بُرْزویه) was a Persian physician in the late Sasanian era, at the time of Khosrow I. He translated the Indian Panchatantra from Sanskrit into Pahlavi (Middle Persian). Both his translation and the original Sanskrit version he worked from are lost. Before their loss, however, his Pahlavi version was translated into Arabic by Ibn al-Muqaffa under the title of Kalīla wa-Dimna or The Fables of Bidpai.

The introduction to Kalīla wa-Dimna presents an autobiography by Borzūya. Beside his ideas, cognitions and inner development leading to a practice of medicine based on philanthropic motivations, Borzuya's search for truth, his skepticism towards established religious thought and his later asceticism are some features lucidly depicted in the text.

== Voyage to India ==
Borzuya was sent to India by Khosrow I to find a plant that is capable of reviving the dead. He later learned from a philosopher that the plant he is seeking is actually a book, the Panchatantra, that is locked in the treasury of the rajah. He received permission to read the book from the rajah, although he was not permitted copy it. Disobeying these instructions, Borzuya would memorize the text he read each day and secretly wrote the book again in Persian, then sent his translation back to his king. When he returned, Khosrow praises the work, stating "the book called Kalila has given my soul new life", and offers Borzuya any reward he chooses from the royal treasury. Instead of gold or jewels, Borzuya chooses a fine suit of clothes and that his name be written in the copy of the Kalila "so that after I die, learned men will not forget the difficulties I went through".

The Semitic scholar François de Blois describes five distinct versions of Borzuya's voyage to India. The versions vary in details of the reasons Borzuya was originally sent to India, the purpose of his trip, and how Borzuya obtained access to the Panchatantra. Scholar disagree as to which of the versions is older and can be traced back to the author of the Pahlavi translations, but agree that the themes of Khosrow's interest in Indian knowledge, particularly of statecraft, the difficulty in obtaining access to the book, etc.

There is considerable discussion whether Borzūya is the same as Bozorgmehr. While sources indicate they are different people, the word "Borzūya" can sometimes be a shortened form of Bozorgmehr.

== See also ==
- Academy of Gundishapur
