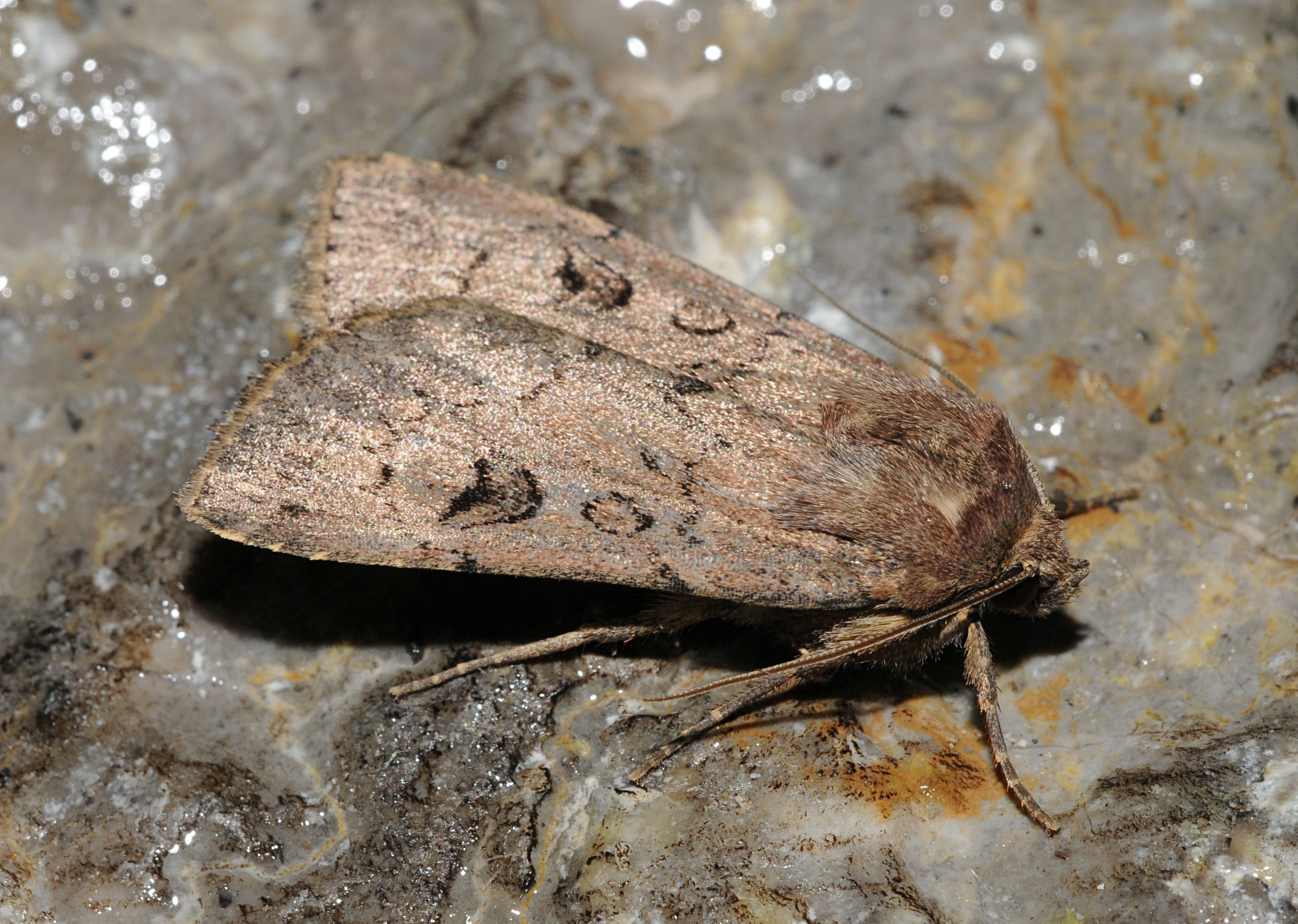

Scientific classification
- Domain: Eukaryota
- Kingdom: Animalia
- Phylum: Arthropoda
- Class: Insecta
- Order: Lepidoptera
- Superfamily: Noctuoidea
- Family: Noctuidae
- Genus: Graphiphora
- Species: G. augur

Binomial name
- Graphiphora augur (Fabricius, 1775)

Synonyms
- Noctua augur Fabricius, 1775; Phalaena (Noctua) omega Esper, 1788; Noctua assimilans Borkhausen, 1792; Noctua hippophaes Geyer, [1832]; Graphiphora tobolskensis Sheljuzhko, 1929; Graphiphora haruspica (Grote, 1875)

= Graphiphora augur =

Species of moth

Graphiphora augur, the double dart or soothsayer, is a moth of the family Noctuidae. The species was first described by Johan Christian Fabricius in 1775. It is found in all of Canada and most of the northern parts of the United States, south in the west to California and New Mexico. It is also found throughout Eurasia, from the British Isles and Scandinavia to Siberia and Japan.

== Technical description and variation ==
The wingspan is 35–42 mm. Forewing uniform brownish grey with a reddish tinge; stigmata concolorous, black edged; claviform narrow; orbicular variable, round, or flattened, sometimes prolonged to touch inner line; reniform with outer edge swollen in the middle, sometimes followed by a dark shade: hindwing a little paler. Form hippophaes [Geyer] is a grey form with the reddish tinge wanting; — helvetina Knaggs is a pale blurred form with obscure markings, and the fringe of hindwing pink.

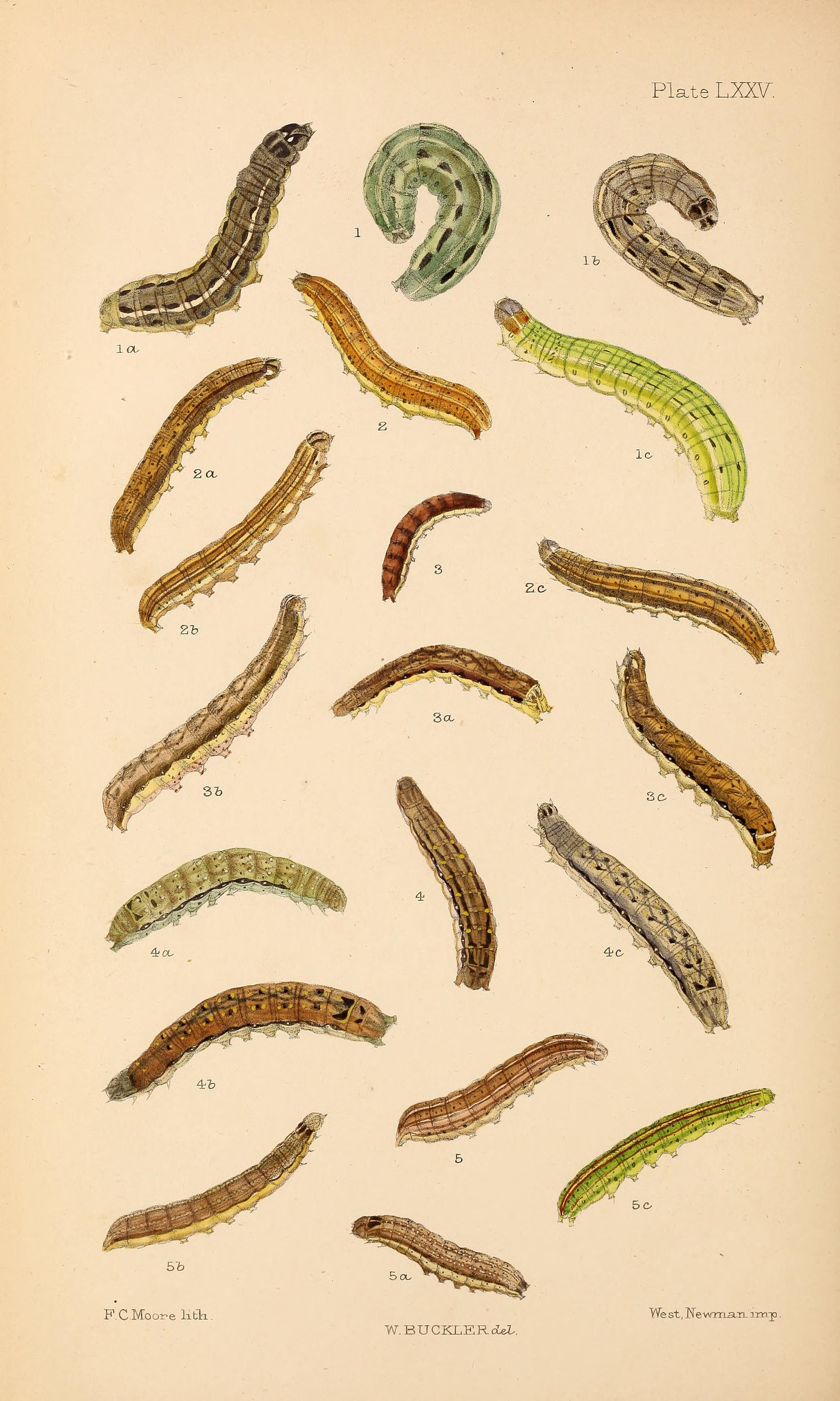
4,4a,4b,4c larva after last moult

== Biology ==
Adults are on wing from June to August depending on the location. There is one generation per year.

The larva vary from purplish brown to greenish grey with a double row of whitish spots on the dorsum and oblique dark streaks; a dark brown blotch across segment 12, swollen at each end, and edged behind with pale. The larvae feed on various trees and shrubs, including Betula, Salix caprea, Salix phylicifolia, Salix cinerea, Populus tremula, Populus balsamifera, Ribes, Rosa species (including Rosa acicularis, Syringa vulgaris and Lonicera caerulea).

== Subspecies ==
- Graphiphora augur augur (Eurasia)
- Graphiphora augur haruspica (Canada, northern United States)
- ?Graphiphora augur sierrae
- ?Graphiphora augur inopinatus
