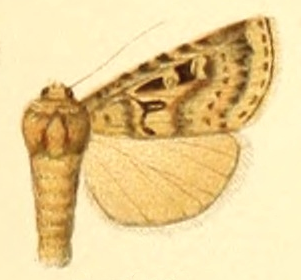

Scientific classification
- Kingdom: Animalia
- Phylum: Arthropoda
- Clade: Pancrustacea
- Class: Insecta
- Order: Lepidoptera
- Superfamily: Noctuoidea
- Family: Noctuidae
- Genus: Goniographa
- Species: G. funkei

Binomial name
- Goniographa funkei (Püngeler, 1901)

Synonyms
- Agrotis funkei Püngeler, 1901; Rhyacia funkei

= Goniographa funkei =

Species of moth

Goniographa funkei is a moth of the family Noctuidae. It is found in the western Tien-Shan Mountains (including the Turkestan Mountains, Karategin Range, Peter I Mountains), the Hissar Mountains and the western parts of the Pamir massif.

The wingspan is 32–36 mm.
