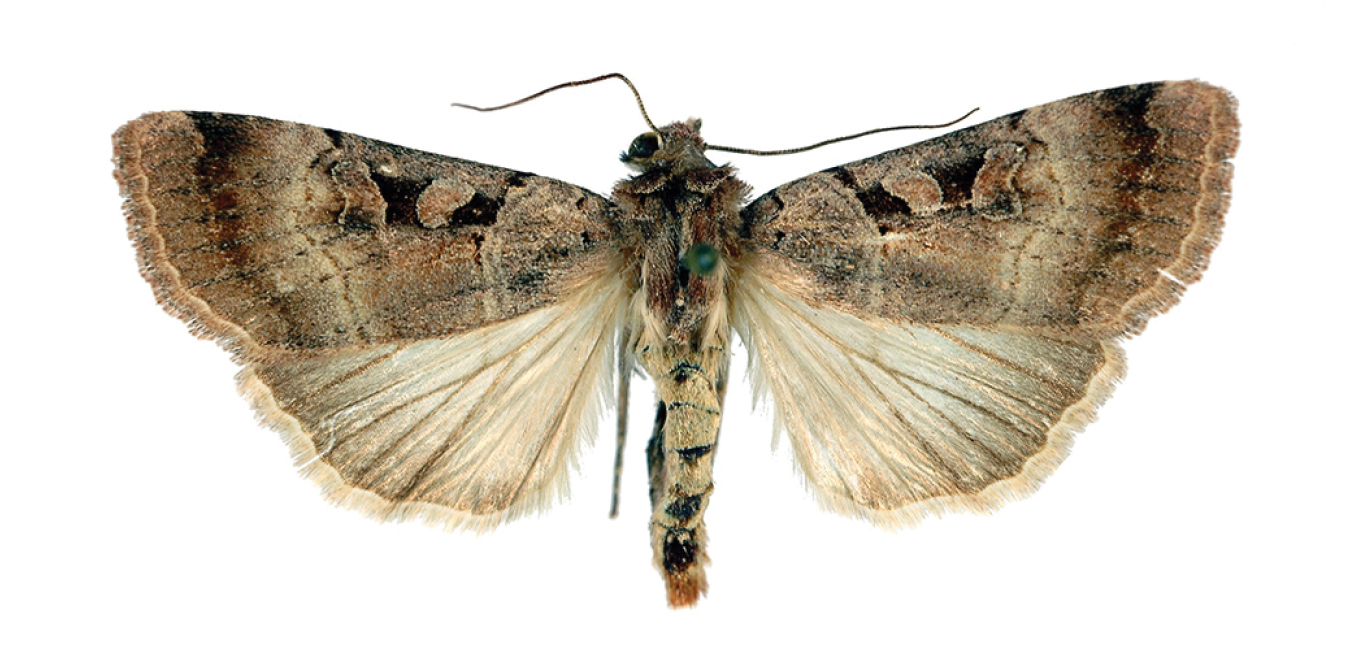

Scientific classification
- Domain: Eukaryota
- Kingdom: Animalia
- Phylum: Arthropoda
- Class: Insecta
- Order: Lepidoptera
- Superfamily: Noctuoidea
- Family: Noctuidae
- Genus: Anagnorisma
- Species: A. eucratides

Binomial name
- Anagnorisma eucratides (Boursin, 1957)

Synonyms
- Eugraphe eucratides Boursin, 1957; Eugnorisma eucratides

= Anagnorisma eucratides =

Species of moth

Anagnorisma eucratides is a moth in the family Noctuidae. It is found in the Hindu Kush Mountains in eastern Afghanistan at altitudes between 2,050 and 2,450 meters.

The ground colour of the forewings is brownish red.
