= Cyril Elgood =

Cyril Lloyd Elgood M.D., F.R.C.P., honorary physician to the king of Persia (Shah) (1893–1970) commonly referred to as Cyril Elgood was a British physician (graduate of St. Bartholomew's Hospital) and historian of medicine in Persia/Iran, best remembered for his breakthrough studies on the history of medical and educational advances of Persia during the period of the 1500s to mid 18th century. He was also known for his work at Her Britannic Majesty's embassy in Tehran, his service in the British army in British India starting in 1914, and his active role in quarantine facilitation during infectious disease outbreaks in south-west Iran.

Elgood took great interest in Persian medicine, and its history and produced several publications on the topic. He also practiced medicine in Persia, as well as back home in Britain where he was a general practitioner in Wareham, Dorset as well as a consultant to two major English hospitals. Elgood was also a cosmopolitan man travelling to most of the Persian Gulf states adding such countries as Sudan, Qatar, and Saudi Arabia to the list of places he had visited where he had transiently practiced medicine and lecturing.

== Historical work ==
Elgood's major achievement was that he managed to combine the commonly delved into history of Post-Islamic Persia as cited through works of such Arabophone Persians such as Ali Abbas Majusi, Razi, and Avicenna, with the less commonly studied history of medicine in Pre-Islamic Persia. In what are perhaps his best recognized works, titled Medical History of Persia and the Eastern Caliphate from the Earliest Times Until 1932, and his Persian Medicine published in Clio Medica series, Elgood traces early concepts of Zoroastrian hygiene, Sassanid influences in Medicine, all the way to Post-Islamic writings of Avicenna, and his contemporaries. Elgood also outlines the debt that Western medicine owes to the Persian physicians and their contributions.

Elgood also focuses on development of Medicine in Safavid Iran, a period stretching roughly from King Ismail I of Persia to the dynasty's fall during King Abbas III's reign. Elgood also delves into India and its medical advances. In the same period of time while Persia is ruled by the Safavids, India is dealing with the Moguls under Zahir al-Din (Ismail's counterpart) all the way to the Moghul Muhammad Shah (Abbas's counterpart). Elgood makes extensive mention of inter-civilization exchange of ideas and staff between Iran and India during this period, one such mention which deals with the Persian physician Abdul-Qadir Gilani and the invention of the so-called hubble-bubble or hookah.

Elgood's areas of interest were majorly surgical, gynecological, and general medicine related. In his Safavid surgery he makes a detailed description of the medical procedures used in Safavid Persia with attention to minor details and his emphasis on anatomy and the steps involved in each procedure, perhaps owing to his medical background as well as his historical interests. Elgood's descriptions of the obstetric, ophthalmological, anaesthetic procedures give insight into great advances made in medicine under Islam in Persia despite the falsely adapted four humor theory of the Greco-Romans and the prohibition of dissections by the Islamic law.

Elgood is also known, although less so, (due to his diminished dwelling on the topic) on the topic of Medical Universities in Iran namely the Academy of Gondishapur where he delineates how certain elements of Greek and the Persian medicine were adapted using the then global Arabic text to educate physicians and health care workers in the city of Gondishapur in today's province of Ahvaz.

=== Gynecology ===
Elgood also had an interest in gynecology in ancient Iran. In his Safavid Medical Practice he delves into midwifery, birth, sterility, pregnancy, abortion, birth control and mother child relations. In the same book he also talks about the use of sedatives, benzodiazepines-like substances, and opium in treatment of common medical ailments in Iran. In this book Elgood also sheds light on some of the treatment for common ailments of the day in Persia such as Whooping cough (Pertussis), and hay fever, as well as the methods used to deal with the newly arriving syphilis (originally contracted from the New World by French explorers and then brought to Persia). The arrival of syphilis via Europe earned the ailment the nickname of the French Pox possibly due to its secondary syphilitic presentation with gray, circular marks all over the body mimicking small pox; Persia, according to Elgood, was at the peak of its performance medically despite having to deal with newly arriving ailments and evolving existing ones.

=== Translations ===
Elgood also produced various translations including Prophetic medicine including his various books on ancient Iranian medicine. This was another dimension to his writing that also incorporated when apt, folk lore, anecdotes and customs. Elgood was also well respected within the historical and medical community as is indicated by this ending quote from Sami K. Hamarneh, P.H.D. who states:

The late Dr. Cyril Elgood left a legacy of writings on the history of medicine in Muslim lands, especially in Persia (Iran)...The recent death of Cyril Elgood was indeed a loss to the many who admired his thorough and intelligent evaluation of Persian medicine, its history and contributions to medical progress.
