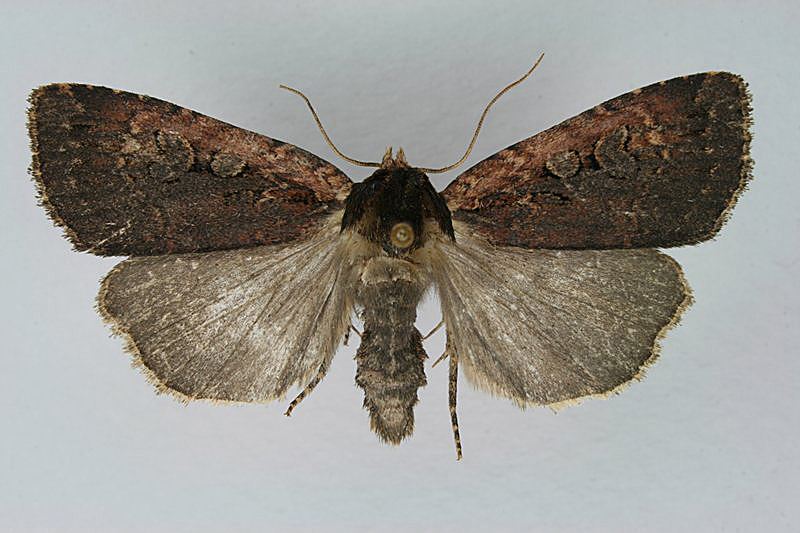

Scientific classification
- Kingdom: Animalia
- Phylum: Arthropoda
- Class: Insecta
- Order: Lepidoptera
- Superfamily: Noctuoidea
- Family: Noctuidae
- Genus: Eugraphe
- Species: E. sigma

Binomial name
- Eugraphe sigma (Schiffermüller, 1775)

Synonyms
- Noctua sigma Denis & Schiffermuller, 1775; Agrotis signum; Noctua characterea [Schiffermüller], 1775; Phalaena (Noctua) characterea Esper, [1803]; Phalaena (Noctua) ditrapezium Esper, [1803]; Phalaena (Noctua) characterea Esper, 1790; Phalaena (Noctua) nubila Esper, 1789; Phalaena (Noctua) nubila Esper, 1798; Phalaena (Noctua) ditrapezium Esper, 1790; Noctua signum Fabricius, 1787; Noctua umbra Vieweg, 1789; Noctua signa Hampson, 1903; Noctua terminalis Strand, 1915; Eugraphe sigma f. obscura Lempke, 1939; Eugraphe sigma f. rufa Lempke, 1939

= Eugraphe sigma =

Species of moth

Eugraphe sigma is a moth of the family Noctuidae. It is found from most of Europe (except Ireland, Great Britain, the Iberian Peninsula and Greece) to the Ural, Siberia, Transcaucasia, Armenia and Korea.

== Description ==
The length of the forewings is 17–20 mm. Warren states R. sigma Schiff. (= characterea Esp., ditrapezium Esp. nec Schiff., signum Fab., umbra View.) (10 a). Forewing black brown or deep brown, with a faint vinous tinge; costal area diffusely brownish-ochreous;the lines ochreous; cell dark brown; upper stigmata large, grey with black edges; claviform small, blackish;hind-wing dark fuscous. A central European species found in France, Switzerland, Germany and Austria;also in Armenia, Siberia and Amurland. Larva reddish yellow, with dorsal and lateral lines white; a dark oblique bar on each segment with a white dot above it; feeds on low plants. - The form nubila Esp. has the costal and apical areas of forewing a dull wood colour.

== Subspecies ==
- Eugraphe sigma sigma
- Eugraphe sigma melancholina Bryk, 1949 (Korea)
- Eugraphe sigma anthracina Boursin, 1954

== Biology ==
Adults are on wing from June to July in one generation per year.

The larvae feed on various low-growing plants, including Lamium album, Viburnum lantana, Laburnum anagyroides, Prunus spinosa, Lonicera and Ligustrum species.
