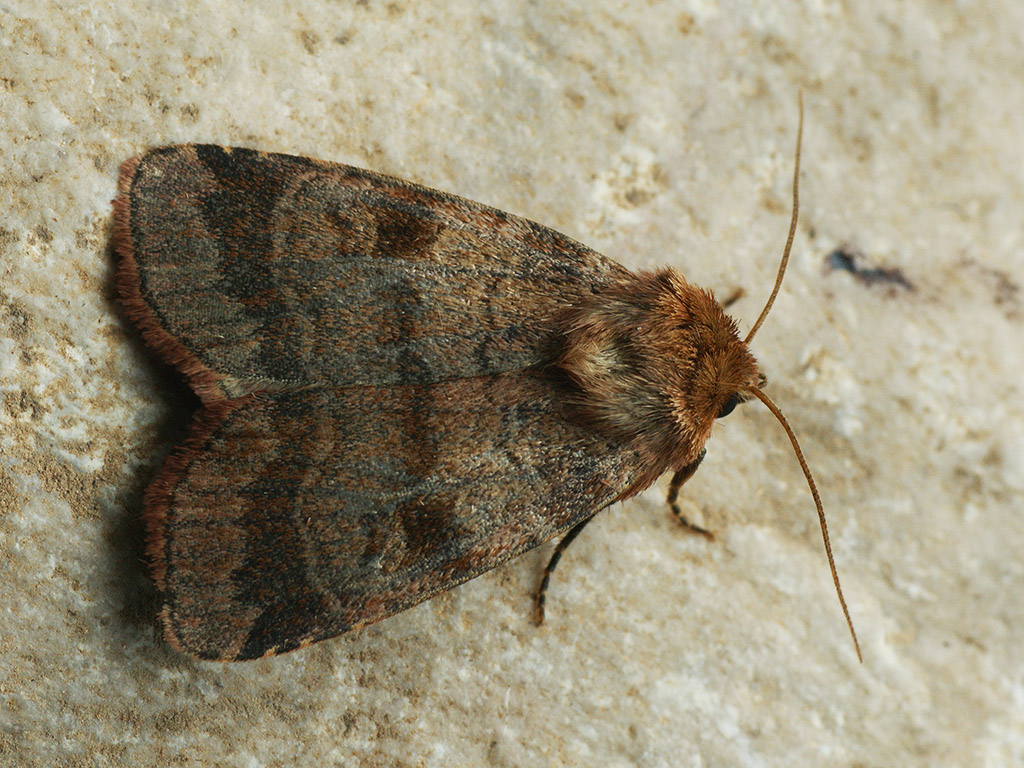
- Paradiarsia punicea

Scientific classification
- Domain: Eukaryota
- Kingdom: Animalia
- Phylum: Arthropoda
- Class: Insecta
- Order: Lepidoptera
- Superfamily: Noctuoidea
- Family: Noctuidae
- Subtribe: Noctuina
- Genus: Paradiarsia; McDunnough, 1929

= Paradiarsia =

Genus of moths

Paradiarsia is a genus of moths of the family Noctuidae.

== Species ==
- Paradiarsia coturnicola Graeser, 1892
- Paradiarsia littoralis (Packard, 1867)
- Paradiarsia punicea (Hübner, [1803])
