= Zandokht Shirazi =

Fakhr ol-Molūk Zandokht Shirazi
- زنددخت شیرازی
- Born: 1909; Iran
- Died: 1953 (aged 44)

Zandokht Shirazi, also Zanddokht Shirazi (Persian: زندخت / زنددخت شیرازی; 1909 – 1953), also known as Fakhr ol-Molūk (فخرالملوک) was a prominent Iranian feminist, poet, school teacher and women's rights activist. Her poems have radical feminist perspectives.

== See also ==
- Women's rights movement in Iran
