= Mostafa Chamran =

Iranian physicist, politician and guerrilla fighter (1932–1981)

- مصطفی چمران
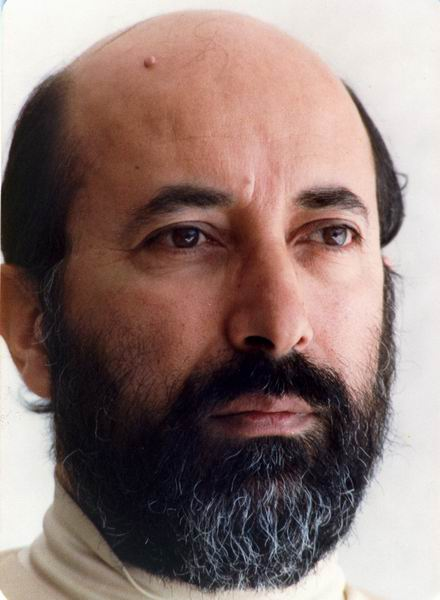
- Chamran c. 1970s

Member of the Parliament of Iran
- In office 28 May 1980 – 21 June 1981
- Constituency: Tehran, Rey, Shemiranat, Eslamshahr and Pardis
- Majority: 1,100,842 (51.5%)

Member of the Supreme National Security Council
- In office 10 May 1980 – 21 June 1981

Minister of Defence
- In office 8 October 1979 – 10 September 1980
- Prime Minister: Mehdi Bazargan
- Supreme Leader: Ruhollah Khomeini
- Preceded by: Ezatollah Nooraei (acting); Taghi Riahi
- Succeeded by: Javad Fakoori

Deputy Prime Minister of Iran for Revolutionary Affairs
- In office 29 April 1979 – 30 September 1979
- Prime Minister: Mehdi Bazargan
- Supreme Leader: Ruhollah Khomeini
- Preceded by: Ebrahim Yazdi
- Succeeded by: Office Abolished

Personal details
- Born: Mostafa Chamran Savehi; 2 October 1932 Tehran, Pahlavi Iran
- Died: 21 June 1981 (aged 48) Dehlaviyeh, Iran
- Resting place: Behesht-e Zahra, Tehran
- Party: Amal Movement (1971–1979)
- Other political affiliations: Freedom Movement of Iran (1960s–1971)
- Spouse: Tamsen Keyston (m. 1961, divorced) Ghada Jaber (m. 1973)
- Children: 4
- Relatives: Mehdi Chamran (brother)
- Education: University of Tehran (BS); Texas A&M University (MS); University of California, Berkeley (PhD)
- Nickname: Jamal

Military service
- Allegiance: Amal Movement; Iran
- Branch/service: Lebanese Resistance Regiments; Islamic Republic of Iran Armed Forces
- Years of service: 1975–1979; 1979–1981
- Commands: Irregular Warfare Headquarters (1979–1981)
- Battles/wars: Lebanese Civil War; 1979 Kurdish rebellion; Battle of Paveh; 1979 Azeri rebellion in Iran; 1979 Turkmen rebellion in Iran; 1979 Khuzestan insurgency; Iran–Iraq War †

Mostafa Chamran Savehi (Persian: مصطفی چمران ساوه‌ای; 2 October 1932 – 21 June 1981) was an Iranian scientist, politician, and guerrilla, best known for serving as the first defense minister of post-revolutionary Iran.

In 1980, Chamran was elected to the Iranian Majles, representing Tehran. That same year, he commanded a paramilitary unit in the Iran–Iraq War, known as the "Irregular Warfare Headquarters". He was later killed on the frontlines.

== Early life and education ==
Chamran was born into a religious Persian family on 2 October 1932 in Tehran. His younger brother was Mehdi Chamran, who later served as the chairman of the City Council of Tehran.

Chamran studied at Alborz High School, while also receiving religious education from Mahmoud Taleghani. After graduating from the University of Tehran with a bachelor's degree in electromechanics, he moved to the United States for higher education under an Imperial Iranian government scholarship, obtaining a master of science in electricial engineering from Texas A&M University. In 1963, Chamran obtained his doctorate in electrical engineering and plasma physics from the University of California, Berkeley. He was subsequently employed as a research staff scientist at Bell Laboratories and later at NASA's Jet Propulsion Laboratory.

== Career ==
=== Revolutionary activities ===
==== Guerilla training ====
In the early 1960s, Chamran became a prominent member of the Freedom Movement of Iran (FMI), a pro-democratic, anti-Shah political organization led by Mehdi Bazargan. He belonged to the party's left-wing religious revolutionary bloc alongside Ebrahim Yazdi, Sadegh Ghotbzadeh and Ali Shariati, all of whom had studied at Western universities.

Chamran went to Cuba to attend a military camp. In December 1963, he, Ghotbzadeh, and Yazdi traveled from the United States to Egypt, where they received training in guerilla warfare. There, they met with Egyptian authorities to propose establishing an anti-Shah organization in the country called the Special Organization for Unity and Action or SAMA, with Chamran leading its military branch.

Upon Chamran's return to the United States in 1965, he founded a group called "Red Shi'ism" in San Jose, aimed at training far-left Islamist militants; his brother Mehdi was an early member. In 1968, he helped establish another anti-Shah and Islamist organization, the Muslim Students' Association of America (MSA), which was led by Yazdi. The MSA soon had branches in the United Kingdom and France.

==== Arab world ====
In 1971, Chamran left the United States for Lebanon to join the Palestine Liberation Organization and Amal Movement. He became a leading figure of the revolutionary Islamic movement in the Middle East, organizing and training guerrilla forces in Algeria, Egypt, and Syria. During Lebanese Civil War, he actively cooperated with Musa al-Sadr and became known as his "right-hand man".

Chamran, along with Sadegh Ghotbzadeh, was known as part of a clique called the “Syrian mafia” within the inner circle of Ruhollah Khomeini. There was a reported feud between this group and a Libya-friendly faction led by Mohammad Montazeri.

=== Post-revolutionary Iran ===
==== Political appointments ====
Following the Iranian Revolution, Chamran returned to Iran in February 1979 and was appointed Deputy Prime Minister for Revolutionary Affairs in the cabinet of Mehdi Bazargan. He was later appointed Minister of Defense, becoming the first civilian defense minister of the Islamic Republic. As a result of this position, Chamran led military action against a rebellion in Kurdistan.

In May 1980, Chamran was elected to the Majles (parliament) as a representative of Tehran. That same month, he was appointed by Khomeini to the Supreme Council of National Defense.

==== Iran-Iraq War ====
When the Iran–Iraq War began in September 1980, Chamran led an irregular warfare infantry unit called the "Irregular Warfare Headquarters". He was wounded in the leg during the Liberation of Susangerd.

== Death ==
Chamran was killed in Dehlaviyeh on 21 June 1981 during a clash with Iraqi forces. The details surrounding his death have remained unclear. He is buried in the Behesht-e Zahra cemetery in Tehran.

== Personal life ==
=== Marriages ===
Chamran married an American woman, Tamsen Keyston, in 1961. They had four children together before divorcing in the early 1970s; one of them, a son named Jamal, died at the age of three in a pool drowning accident in 1973.

During his time in Lebanon, Chamran remarried a Lebanese woman, Ghada Jaber, who was also a member of the Amal Movement.

== Legacy ==
Ayatollah Khomeini publicly proclaimed Chamran as a "proud commander of Islam". Chamran was posthumously honoured by having buildings and streets in Iran and Lebanon named after him, including a major expressway. A species of moth was named after him in 2013.

=== Media ===
In 2012, Mohsen Alavipour published a Persian-language biography of Chamran. The next year, an English-language biography of Chamran titled 22: Not a new lifestyle for those who thirst for humanity! was published in the United Kingdom.

In 2014, a film titled Che (Persian: چ), directed by Ebrahim Hatamikia, was released to honour Chamran. The film portrays two days in Chamran's life following the Iranian Revolution. In 2017, Reza Mirkarimi produced an animated film about Chamran.

== See also ==
- Asghar Vesali

Government offices
Preceded by Taghi Riahi	Minister of Defense; 8 October 1979–10 September 1980	Succeeded by Javad Fakoori
Military offices
Preceded by {{{before}}}	Commander of the Irregular Warfare Headquarters; 1979–1981	Succeeded by Mehdi Chamran
