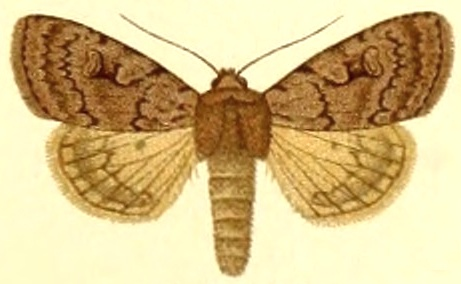
- Coenophila

Scientific classification
- Domain: Eukaryota
- Kingdom: Animalia
- Phylum: Arthropoda
- Class: Insecta
- Order: Lepidoptera
- Superfamily: Noctuoidea
- Family: Noctuidae
- Subtribe: Noctuina
- Genus: Coenophila; Stephens, 1850

= Coenophila =

Genus of moths

Coenophila is a genus of moths of the family Noctuidae.

== Species ==
- Coenophila opacifrons Grote, 1878
- Coenophila subrosea – rosy marsh moth (Stephens, 1829)
