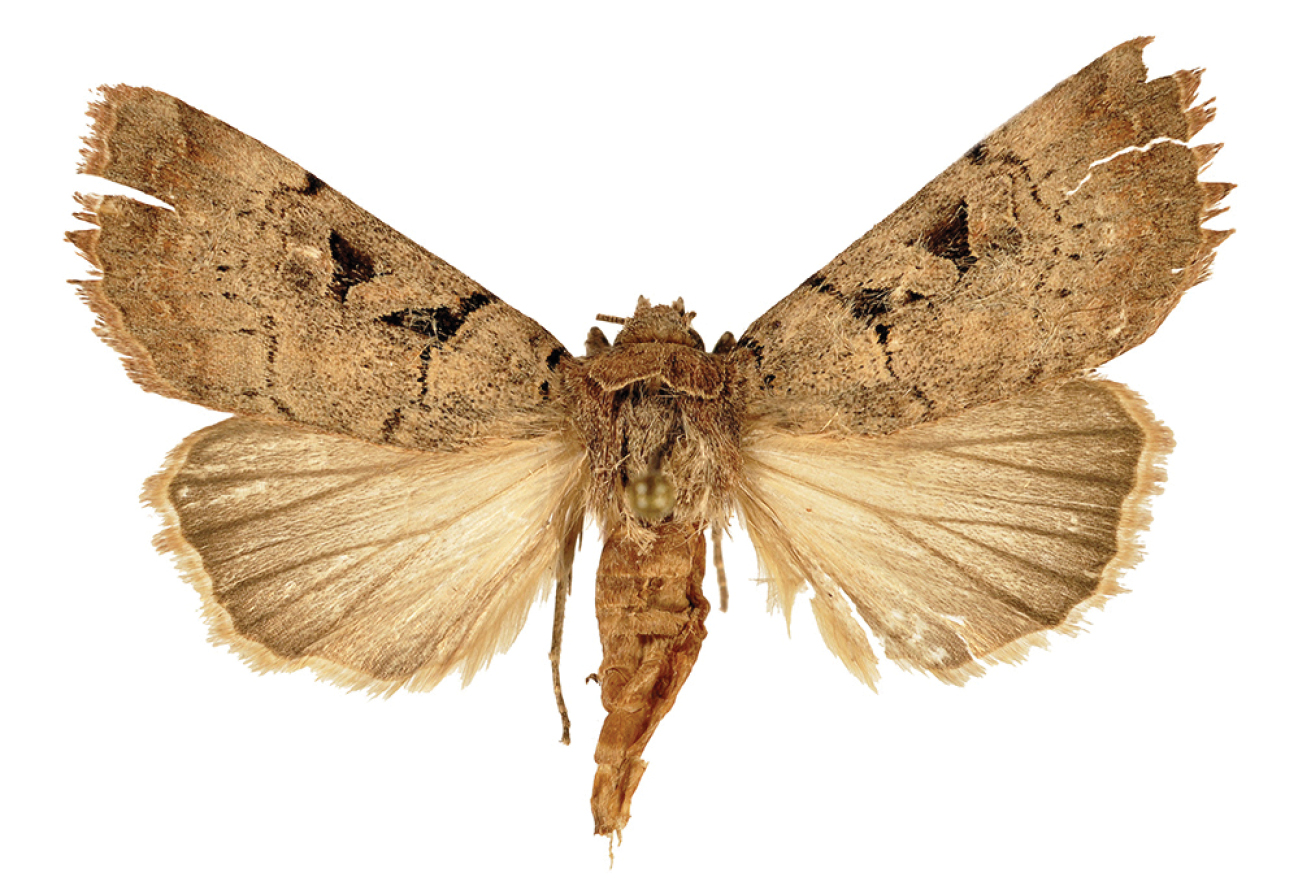

Scientific classification
- Domain: Eukaryota
- Kingdom: Animalia
- Phylum: Arthropoda
- Class: Insecta
- Order: Lepidoptera
- Superfamily: Noctuoidea
- Family: Noctuidae
- Tribe: Noctuini
- Genus: Anagnorisma; Ronkay and Varga, 1999

= Anagnorisma =

Genus of insects

Anagnorisma is a genus of moths of the family Noctuidae.

== Species ==
- Anagnorisma chamrani Gyulai, Rabieh, Seraj, Ronkay & Esfandiari, 2013
- Anagnorisma eucratides (Boursin, 1957)
- Anagnorisma goniophora (Hacker, Ronkay & Varga, 1990)
- Anagnorisma glareomima (Varga & Ronkay, 1991)
- Anagnorisma zakaria Ronkay & Varga, 1999
