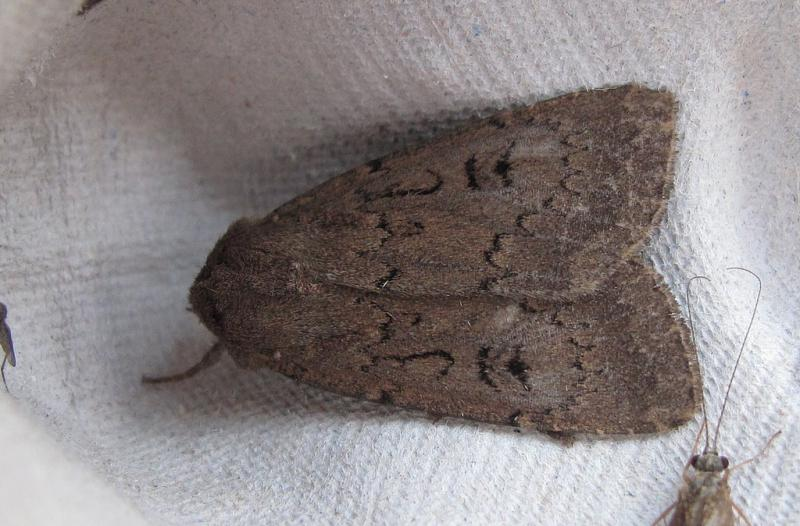
- Graphiphora augur

Scientific classification
- Kingdom: Animalia
- Phylum: Arthropoda
- Clade: Pancrustacea
- Class: Insecta
- Order: Lepidoptera
- Superfamily: Noctuoidea
- Family: Noctuidae
- Subtribe: Noctuina
- Genus: Graphiphora; Ochsenheimer, 1816

= Graphiphora =

Genus of moths

Graphiphora is a genus of moths of the family Noctuidae.

== Species ==
- Graphiphora augur (Fabricius, 1775)
