= Soudabeh Babagap =

Iranian documentary filmmaker, poet, and painter

Soudabeh Babagap (Persian: سودابه باباگپ; also transliterated as Sudabe Babagap) is an Iranian documentary filmmaker, poet, and painter. She is best known for her 25-minute documentary film Noah's Ark which won Grand Prix of the Belgrade Documentary Festival, was shown at many festivals such as Yamagata, Russian Golden Night, and Sheffield. Babagap's poems are included in some anthologies of poets from Iran and are translated in English. She is also a guest lecturer in some European universities and cultural institutes, discussing Iranian documentary cinema and prominent documentary filmmakers.
