= Cyrus Kar =

Iranian film director

- Born: March 18, 1961 (age 65); Tehran, Iran
- Occupation: Film director

Cyrus Kar (born March 18, 1961) is an Iranian-born American film director, and vindicated alleged terrorist who was captured by United States forces in Iraq on May 17, 2005, while filming a documentary on the life of Cyrus The Great. On July 10, 2005, he was released from custody after his family sued, accused the U.S. government of violating his civil rights and detaining him after his clearance by the FBI. He has been accused of smuggling washing machine timers for use in improvised explosive devices in a taxi he was riding into Baghdad.

== Early life ==
Although born in Iran, his family moved to Germany when he was two and then to America when he was five, where he was brought up in the American culture. He returned to Iran at nine, where, barring one year in Germany, he lived until returning to America at 14. He attended kindergarten and elementary school in Utah, high school in Washington and subsequently entered the Navy, attaining the rank of Third Class Petty Officer.

After leaving the navy, he attained degrees from San Jose State University and Pepperdine University. He also worked in Silicon Valley for 13 years before starting a film career.

== Controversy ==
Kar began working on a documentary film about his namesake Cyrus the Great (Persian King) and visited England, Germany, Iran, Turkey, Afghanistan, and Tajikistan for shooting before obtaining permission from the US government to visit Iraq. He arrived in the country on May 7, 2005, and was arrested after ten days of filming on May 17 by Iraqi security forces before being handed over to US forces. He was then taken to Abu Ghraib prison before eventually ending up in Camp Cropper, where he spent the remainder of his incarceration in solitary confinement. According to the ACLU, he had been permitted three phone calls and a visit from the ICRC.

On July 6, the American Civil Liberties Union filed a petition for habeas corpus on Kar's behalf. On July 10, he was released from military custody.

On an August 24, 2005, segment on the Nightline television show Kar described painful and humiliating abuse from US personnel, while in custody in Iraq.

== Lawsuit ==
On July 7, 2006, Kar sued Secretary of Defense Donald Rumsfeld and other military officials, calling the government's detention policies unconstitutional. He also claimed that he was hooded, threatened, taunted and insulted by US soldiers. The lawsuit said his detention violated his Civil rights, Geneva Conventions as well as International law. "Human rights monitors note that the vast majority of the over 15,000 detainees in U.S. military custody in Iraq have never been charged, tried, provided counsel, or allowed to challenge their detention in court, and over one-fifth of them have been detained for over a year in this manner," the suit states. "Mr. Kar was imprisoned by the United States military in Iraq without the slightest hint of legal authority," said Mark Rosenbaum, a senior attorney at the American Civil Liberties Union, filing the lawsuit on his behalf. "Saddam Hussein has had more due process than Cyrus Kar; this is a detention policy that was drafted by Kafka." The lawsuit was voluntarily dismissed in July, 2008 after the US Army Field Manual FM 3-24 adopted Common Article 3 of the Geneva Convention governing U.S. detention operations.
