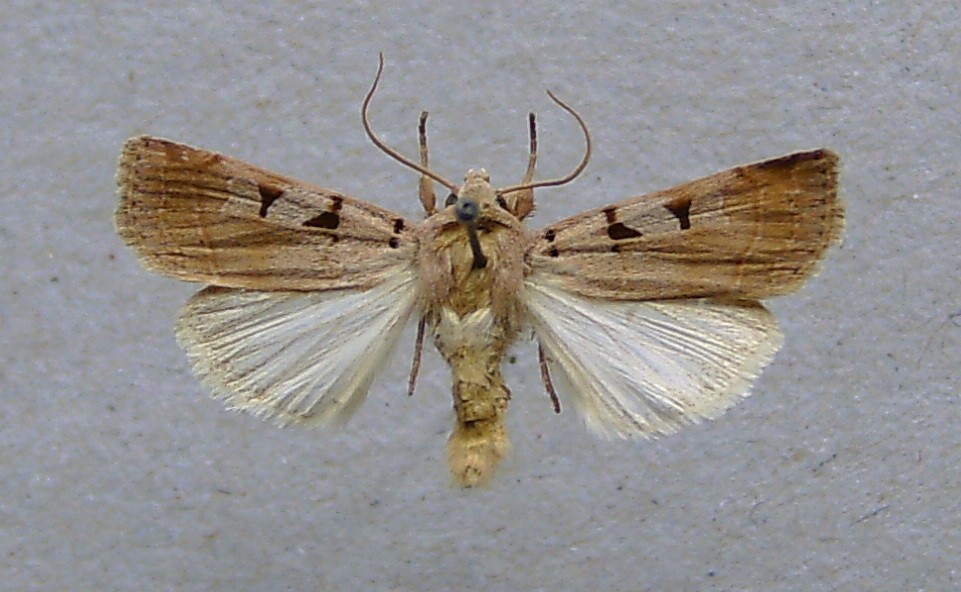

Scientific classification
- Domain: Eukaryota
- Kingdom: Animalia
- Phylum: Arthropoda
- Class: Insecta
- Order: Lepidoptera
- Superfamily: Noctuoidea
- Family: Noctuidae
- Subfamily: Noctuinae
- Genus: Eugnorisma; Boursin, 1946

= Eugnorisma =

Genus of moths

Eugnorisma is a genus of moths of the family Noctuidae.

== Species ==
- Eugnorisma arenoflavida Schawerda, 1934
- Eugnorisma chaldaica Boisduval, 1840
- Eugnorisma depuncta Linnaeus, 1761
- Eugnorisma glareosa Esper, 1788
- Eugnorisma ignoratum Varga and Ronkay, 1994
- Eugnorisma insignata Lederer, 1853
- Eugnorisma jubilans Varga, Ronkay, and Guylai, 1995
- Eugnorisma miniago Freyer, 1839
- Eugnorisma pontica Staudinger, 1891
- Eugnorisma puengeleri Varga and Ronkay, 1987
