= Agnathosia sandoeensis =

Scientific classification
- Kingdom: Animalia
- Phylum: Arthropoda
- Class: Insecta
- Order: Lepidoptera
- Family: Tineidae
- Genus: Agnathosia
- Species: A. sandoeensis

Binomial name
- Agnathosia sandoeensis Jonasson, 1977

Species of moth

Agnathosia sandoeensis is a moth belonging to the family Tineidae. The species was first described by Jan Å. Jonasson in 1977.

It is native to Northern Europe.
