= Coleophora carelica =

Scientific classification
- Kingdom: Animalia
- Phylum: Arthropoda
- Class: Insecta
- Order: Lepidoptera
- Family: Coleophoridae
- Genus: Coleophora
- Species: C. carelica

Binomial name
- Coleophora carelica Hackman, 1945

Synonyms
- Coleophora baltica Toll, 1952

Species of moth

Coleophora carelica is a moth of the family Coleophoridae. It is found in Latvia, Estonia, Finland, and northern Russia.

The larvae feed on the leaves of Achillea millefolium and possibly Artemisia species.
