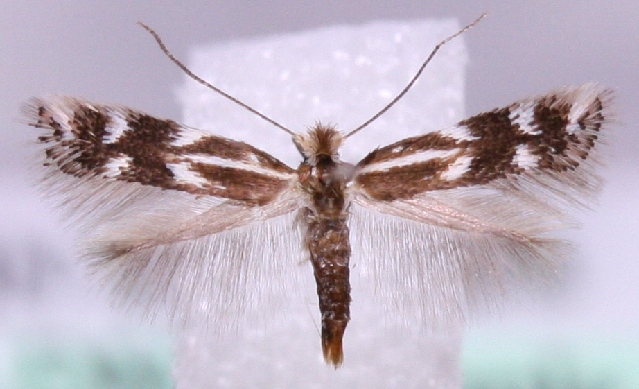

Scientific classification
- Kingdom: Animalia
- Phylum: Arthropoda
- Clade: Pancrustacea
- Class: Insecta
- Order: Lepidoptera
- Family: Bucculatricidae
- Genus: Bucculatrix
- Species: B. latviaella

Binomial name
- Bucculatrix latviaella Šulcs, 1990

= Bucculatrix latviaella =

Species of moth

Bucculatrix latviaella is a moth in the family Bucculatricidae. It was described by Ivars Šulcs in 1990. It is found in Fennoscandia, Estonia and Latvia.

The larvae feed on Erigeron acer and possibly Achillea millefolium and/or Leucanthemum vulgare. They mine the leaves of their host plant.
