= Agonopterix bipunctosa =

Scientific classification
- Kingdom: Animalia
- Phylum: Arthropoda
- Clade: Pancrustacea
- Class: Insecta
- Order: Lepidoptera
- Family: Depressariidae
- Genus: Agonopterix
- Species: A. bipunctosa

Binomial name
- Agonopterix bipunctosa (Curtis, 1850)

Synonyms
- Depressaria bipunctosa Curtis, 1850; Depressaria perpallorella Morris, 1870

Species of moth

Agonopterix bipunctosa is a moth of the family Depressariidae. It is found in Great Britain, France, Sweden, Poland, Latvia and Russia.

The wingspan is 18–22 mm. Adults are on wing from July to September.

The larvae feed on Serratula tinctoria. They feed in spun shoots and rolled leaves of their host plant. Larvae can be found from May to June.
