= Udea costalis =

Scientific classification
- Domain: Eukaryota
- Kingdom: Animalia
- Phylum: Arthropoda
- Class: Insecta
- Order: Lepidoptera
- Family: Crambidae
- Genus: Udea
- Species: U. costalis

Binomial name
- Udea costalis (Eversmann, 1852)

Synonyms
- Botys costalis Eversmann, 1852; Pionea costalis var. alaicalis Caradja, 1916; Botys hilaralis Christoph, 1881; Botys hyperborealis var. hoffmanni Krulikovsky, 1898; Mesographe itysalis maurinalis W. P. Curtis, 1934; Pionea costalis var. alaicalis f. brunnealis Caradja, 1916

Species of moth

Udea costalis is a species of moth in the family Crambidae described by Eduard Friedrich Eversmann in 1852. It is found in Spain, France, Poland, Lithuania, Latvia, Russia, Kyrgyzstan and China.
