= Coleophora expressella =

Scientific classification
- Kingdom: Animalia
- Phylum: Arthropoda
- Class: Insecta
- Order: Lepidoptera
- Family: Coleophoridae
- Genus: Coleophora
- Species: C. expressella

Binomial name
- Coleophora expressella Klemensiewicz, 1902

Synonyms
- Coleophora subdirectella Kanerva, 1941

Species of moth

Coleophora expressella is a moth of the family Coleophoridae. It is found from Fennoscandia, through Germany and Poland to Italy. It has also been recorded from Bulgaria and China.
