= Scythris flavidella =

Scientific classification
- Domain: Eukaryota
- Kingdom: Animalia
- Phylum: Arthropoda
- Class: Insecta
- Order: Lepidoptera
- Family: Scythrididae
- Genus: Scythris
- Species: S. flavidella

Binomial name
- Scythris flavidella Preissecker, 1911

Species of moth

Scythris flavidella is a species of moth belonging to the family Scythrididae.

It is native to Central Europe.
