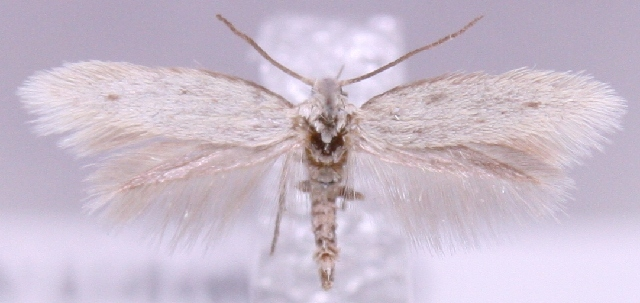

Scientific classification
- Kingdom: Animalia
- Phylum: Arthropoda
- Class: Insecta
- Order: Lepidoptera
- Family: Elachistidae
- Genus: Elachista
- Species: E. bruuni

Binomial name
- Elachista bruuni Traugott-Olsen, 1990

= Elachista bruuni =

Species of moth

Elachista bruuni is a moth of the family Elachistidae. It is found in Finland, Russia, Estonia and Latvia.

The wingspan is 9–10 millimetres (0.35–0.39 in). Adults are on wing in June and July.
