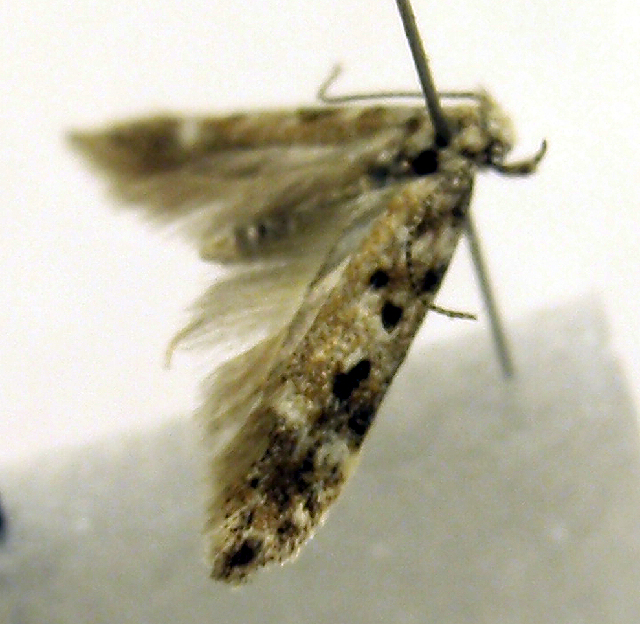

Scientific classification
- Kingdom: Animalia
- Phylum: Arthropoda
- Clade: Pancrustacea
- Class: Insecta
- Order: Lepidoptera
- Family: Gelechiidae
- Genus: Scrobipalpa
- Species: S. bryophiloides

Binomial name
- Scrobipalpa bryophiloides Povolný, 1966

= Scrobipalpa bryophiloides =

Species of moth

Scrobipalpa bryophiloides is a moth of the family Gelechiidae. It is distributed in northern, eastern, and southeast Europe (from Finland and Latvia to Ukraine and Greece to the Volga region and the southern Ural). It is also found from Turkey to the Middle East, Central Asia (Turkmenistan, Uzbekistan, Kazakhstan, Iran), China (Inner Mongolia, Ningxia, Shaanxi, Xinjiang) and Mongolia.

The length of the forewings is 5–6.1 mm (0.20–0.24 in). The larvae feed on Suaeda confusa (=Suaeda acuminata). They possibly mine the leaves of their host plant.
