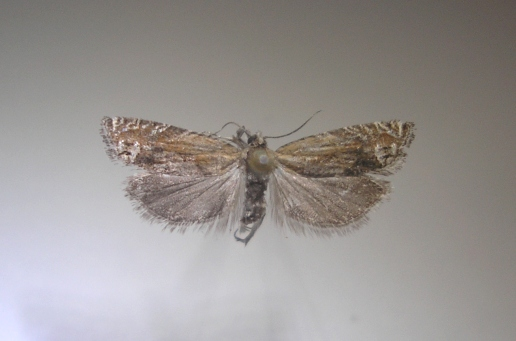

Scientific classification
- Kingdom: Animalia
- Phylum: Arthropoda
- Clade: Pancrustacea
- Class: Insecta
- Order: Lepidoptera
- Family: Tortricidae
- Genus: Eucosma
- Species: E. suomiana

Binomial name
- Eucosma suomiana (Hoffmann, 1893)

Synonyms
- Grapholitha suomiana Hoffmann, 1893

= Eucosma suomiana =

Species of moth

Eucosma suomiana is a moth of the family Tortricidae. It is found from Sweden, through Finland and the Baltic region to northern Russia.

The wingspan is 10–17 mm.
