= Coleophora jaernaensis =

Scientific classification
- Kingdom: Animalia
- Phylum: Arthropoda
- Class: Insecta
- Order: Lepidoptera
- Family: Coleophoridae
- Genus: Coleophora
- Species: C. jaernaensis

Binomial name
- Coleophora jaernaensis Björklund & Palmqvist, 2002

Species of moth

Coleophora jaernaensis is a moth of the family Coleophoridae. It is found in Sweden, Finland, Latvia and Germany.

The wingspan is 11–14 millimetres (0.43–0.55 in). Adults are on wing in June and July.
