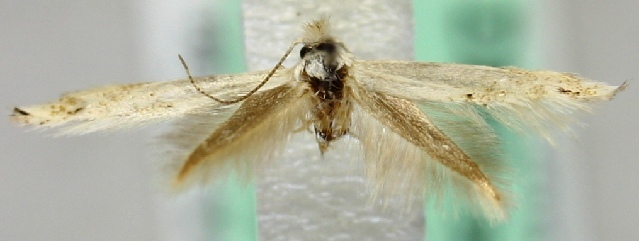

Scientific classification
- Kingdom: Animalia
- Phylum: Arthropoda
- Clade: Pancrustacea
- Class: Insecta
- Order: Lepidoptera
- Family: Bucculatricidae
- Genus: Bucculatrix
- Species: B. rhamniella

Binomial name
- Bucculatrix rhamniella Herrich-Schäffer, 1855

= Bucculatrix rhamniella =

Species of moth

Bucculatrix rhamniella is a moth in the family Bucculatricidae. It was described by Gottlieb August Wilhelm Herrich-Schäffer in 1855. It is found in Poland, the Baltic region, Hungary and Romania. A record from the Netherlands is based on a misidentification.

The wingspan is 10–11 mm. There are usually two generations per year.

The larvae feed on Rhamnus catharticus and Rhamnus pumilis. They mine the leaves of their host plant.
