= Coleophora obscuripalpella =

Scientific classification
- Kingdom: Animalia
- Phylum: Arthropoda
- Class: Insecta
- Order: Lepidoptera
- Family: Coleophoridae
- Genus: Coleophora
- Species: C. obscuripalpella

Binomial name
- Coleophora obscuripalpella Kanerva, 1941

Species of moth

Coleophora obscuripalpella is a moth of the family Coleophoridae. It is found in Sweden, Finland, Latvia and northern Russia.

The wingspan is 10–11 mm. Adults are on wing from May and July.

The larvae feed on the leaves of Ledum palustre and Chamaedaphne calyculata.
