= Scrobipalpa pulchra =

Scientific classification
- Kingdom: Animalia
- Phylum: Arthropoda
- Clade: Pancrustacea
- Class: Insecta
- Order: Lepidoptera
- Family: Gelechiidae
- Genus: Scrobipalpa
- Species: S. pulchra

Binomial name
- Scrobipalpa pulchra Povolný, 1967

Species of moth

Scrobipalpa pulchra is a moth of the family Gelechiidae. It is found in Latvia, Russia (the southern Ural), Ukraine, the Near East and Middle East, Turkey, Central Asia, Mongolia and China (Xinjiang).

The larvae feed on Haloxylon persicum, Haloxylon ammodendron, Haloxylon subaphyllus, Climacoptera crassa and Gamanthus gamocarpus.
