= Elachista fuscofrontella =

Scientific classification
- Kingdom: Animalia
- Phylum: Arthropoda
- Clade: Pancrustacea
- Class: Insecta
- Order: Lepidoptera
- Family: Elachistidae
- Genus: Elachista
- Species: E. fuscofrontella

Binomial name
- Elachista fuscofrontella Sruoga, 1990

Species of moth

Elachista fuscofrontella is type a moth of the family Elachistidae. It is found in Estonia, Latvia, and Russian Far East.
