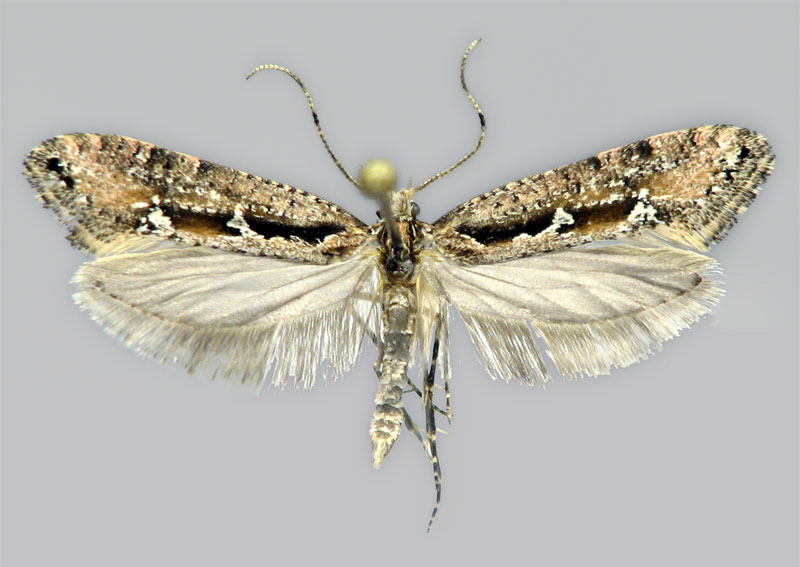

Scientific classification
- Domain: Eukaryota
- Kingdom: Animalia
- Phylum: Arthropoda
- Class: Insecta
- Order: Lepidoptera
- Family: Plutellidae
- Genus: Rhigognostis
- Species: R. schmaltzella

Binomial name
- Rhigognostis schmaltzella (Zetterstedt, 1839)

Synonyms
- Plutella schmaltzella Zetterstedt, 1839

= Rhigognostis schmaltzella =

Species of moth

Rhigognostis schmaltzella is a moth of the family Plutellidae. It is found in Estonia, Latvia, Fennoscandia and Germany.

The wingspan is 17–20 mm.
