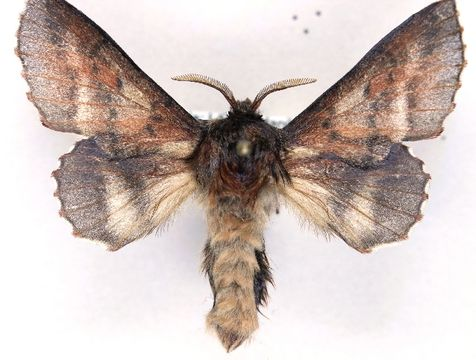

Scientific classification
- Domain: Eukaryota
- Kingdom: Animalia
- Phylum: Arthropoda
- Class: Insecta
- Order: Lepidoptera
- Family: Lasiocampidae
- Genus: Phyllodesma
- Species: P. japonica

Binomial name
- Phyllodesma japonica (Leech, 1889)

= Phyllodesma japonica =

Species of moth

Phyllodesma japonica is a moth belonging to the family Lasiocampidae. The species was first described by John Henry Leech in 1889.

It is native to Eurasia.
