= Scythris emichi =

Scientific classification
- Domain: Eukaryota
- Kingdom: Animalia
- Phylum: Arthropoda
- Class: Insecta
- Order: Lepidoptera
- Family: Scythrididae
- Genus: Scythris
- Species: S. emichi

Binomial name
- Scythris emichi (Anker, 1870)

Species of moth

Scythris emichi is a species of moth belonging to the family Scythrididae.

Synonym:

- Butalis emichi Anker, 1870
