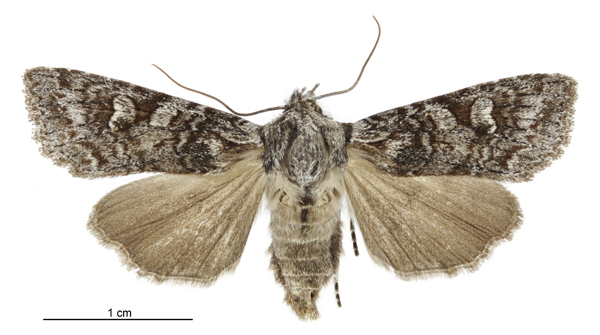
- Female
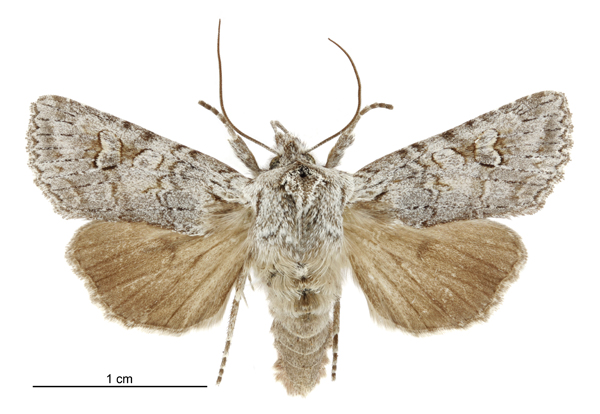
- Male

Scientific classification
- Kingdom: Animalia
- Phylum: Arthropoda
- Class: Insecta
- Order: Lepidoptera
- Superfamily: Noctuoidea
- Family: Noctuidae
- Genus: Physetica
- Species: P. longstaffi

Binomial name
- Physetica longstaffi (Howes, 1911)

Synonyms
- Morrisonia longstaffii Howes, 1911; Morrisonia longstaffi Howes; Longstaff, 1912; Aletia longstaffi (Howes, 1911)

= Physetica longstaffi =

Species of moth endemic to New Zealand

Physetica longstaffi is a species of moth of the family Noctuidae. It is endemic to New Zealand and found in the North and South Islands. This species lives in open habitats and shrublands, at altitudes ranging from the low alpine zone down to sea-level. As at 2017 the biology of this species is in need of further investigation as there is no published description of the larvae of this species nor have larval specimens been preserved in collections. There is also confusion over the possible larval host plants for this species. This species is on the wing from February to May. There is also a record from the North Cape in December. The adults of this species is attracted to light. P. longstaffi might possibly be confused with P. sequens or P. phricias. However unlike both P. sequens and P. phricias, P. longstaffi has a large oval mark near the centre of the forewing. Other distinguishing features include further differences in the colouration of the forewings of P. longstaffi as well as differences in the third labial palp segment of the male and differences in the shape of the male genitalia.

== Taxonomy ==
This species was first described in 1911 by George Howes and named Morrisonia longstaffii in honour of George Blundell Longstaff. The spelling of the species name was changed to Morrisonia longstaffi in 1912 by Longstaff and it is this spelling that has subsequently been used. In 2017 Robert Hoare undertook a review of New Zealand Noctuinae and placed this species in the genus Physetica. He also considered the spelling of the species name and preserved and treated longstaffi as the correct spelling under ICZN Article 33.3.1 as "it is in prevailing usage and is attributed to the publication of the original spelling". The male holotype specimen was collected by Howes near Tomahawk Beach in Dunedin and is held at the Auckland War Memorial Museum.

== Description ==
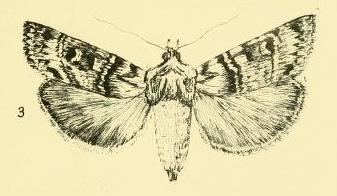
Illustration of P. longstaffi by George Howes

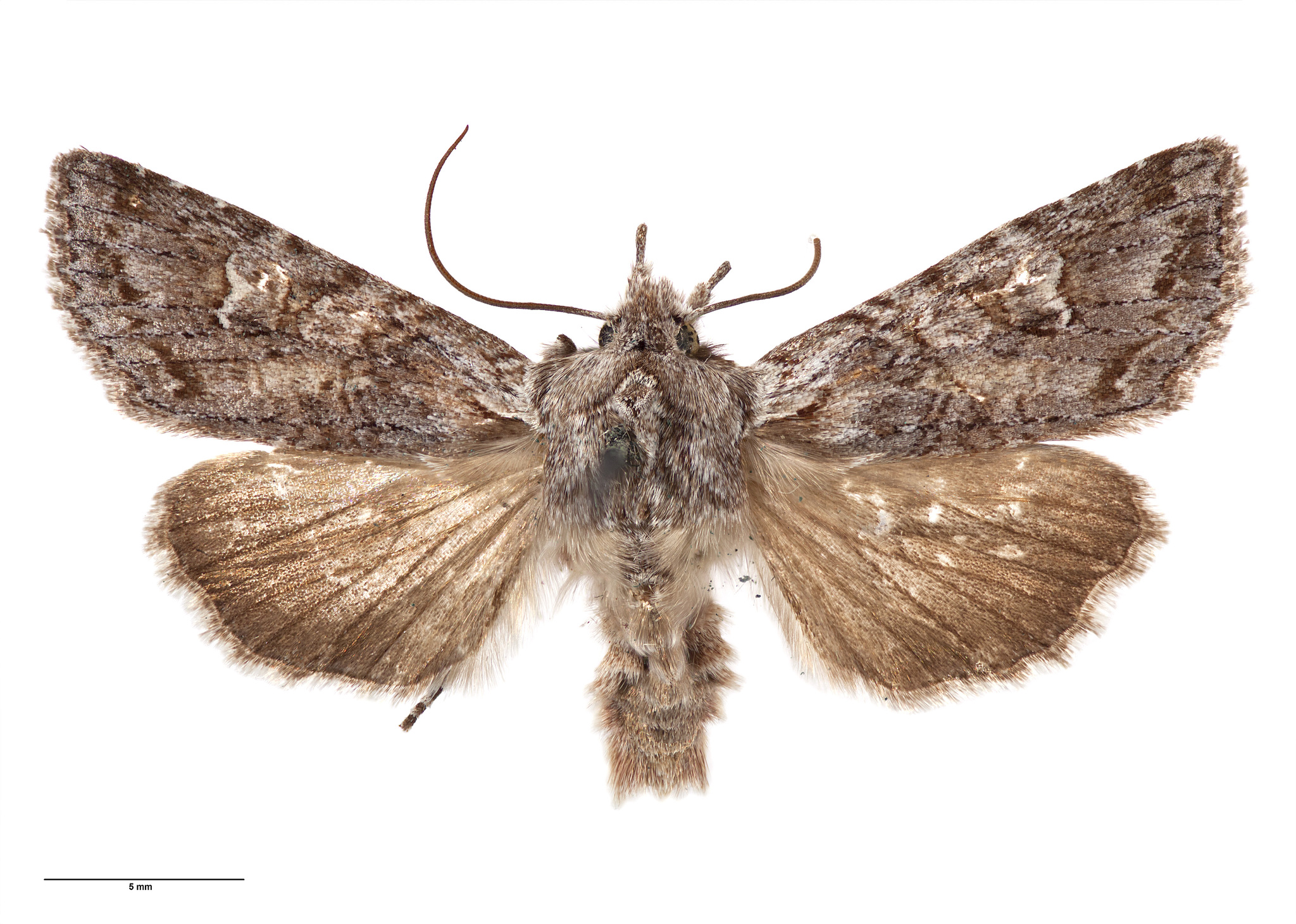
Holotype of P. longstaffi held at the Auckland War Memorial Museum.

Howes originally described the species as follows:

Expanse. 28 to 30 lines. Antennae ferruginous-grey, filiform. Legs, palpi, head, and thorax grey irrorated with ferruginous. A dark mark across front of thoracic crest. Crests strong. Abdomen greyish-ochreous, lighter in colour towards anal tuft, which is light ochreous-grey. Forewings grey, markings ferruginous. Reniform and orbicular grey out-lined with ferruginous. Base of wing light grey, followed by a dark jagged transverse line. A double jagged transverse line at 1/4 across wing. A suffused patch around reniform, continuing as a well-defined jagged line with a faint line on each side to dorsum. A rather indistinct suffused line near termen. Cilia grey. Hindwings uniform dark-grey. Cilia silvery-grey with a dark-grey line at base.

The male adult of this species has a wingspan of between 30 and 36 mm and the female has a wingspan of between 33 and 37 mm. P. longstaffi might possibly be confused with P. sequens or P. phricias. However unlike both P. sequens and P. phricias, P. longstaffi has a large oval mark near the centre of the forewing. There are other distinguishing features such as the differences in the colouration of the forewings of P. longstaffi as well as differences in the third labial palp segment of the male and differences in the shape of the male genitalia.

== Distribution ==
This species is endemic to New Zealand and is found throughout the North and South Islands.

== Habitat ==
This species lives in open habitats and shrublands, at altitudes ranging from the low alpine zone down to sea-level.

== Behaviour ==
This species is on the wing from February to May. There is also a record from the North Cape in December. This species is attracted to light.

== Biology and host species ==
As at 2017 the biology of this species is in need of further investigation as there is no published description of the larvae of this species nor have larval specimens been preserved in collections. There is also confusion over the larval host plants for this species. Larvae have been collected on species within the genus Craspedia and reared to adulthood. They have also been collected on narrow leaved Dracophyllum but these specimens were reared to adulthood on plantain and chickweed. Larvae have also been found on Dracophyllum subulatum but failed to thrive when given Dracophyllum sinclairii and subsequently died. It has been hypothesised that species within the genus Dracophyllum might well be host plants but that the difficulty in keeping the offered foliage in good condition could be the reason for these deaths. It was also hypothesised that it is possible that larvae rest on species within the genus Dracophyllum in order to avoid parasitic wasps and flies that might otherwise be attracted by larval feeding.
