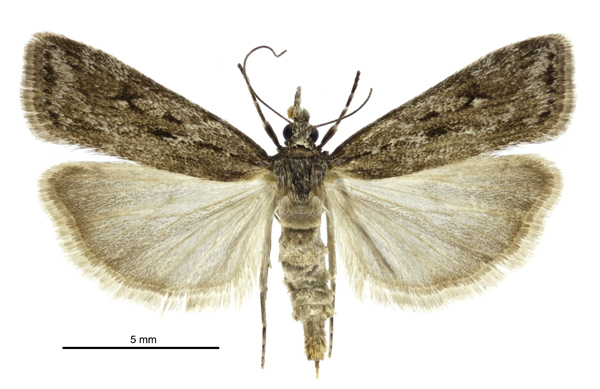
- Female
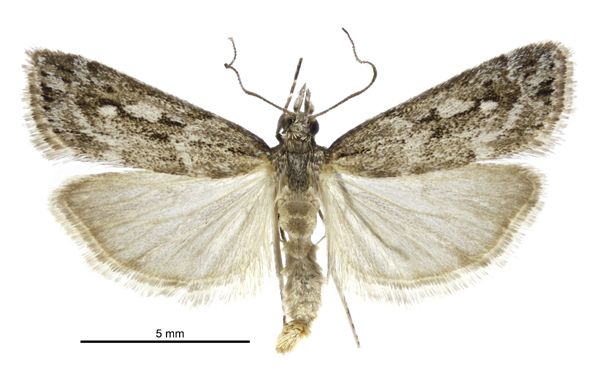
- Male

Scientific classification
- Kingdom: Animalia
- Phylum: Arthropoda
- Clade: Pancrustacea
- Class: Insecta
- Order: Lepidoptera
- Family: Crambidae
- Genus: Eudonia
- Species: E. ustiramis

Binomial name
- Eudonia ustiramis (Meyrick, 1931)

Synonyms
- Scoparia ustiramis Meyrick, 1931

= Eudonia ustiramis =

Species of moth

Eudonia ustiramis is a species of moth in the family Crambidae. This species is endemic to New Zealand. It is classified as "Data Deficient" by the Department of Conservation.

== Taxonomy ==
This species was described by Edward Meyrick in 1931 using a specimen collected by S.C. Patterson in Whangārei in January and named Scoparia ustiramis. George Hudson discussed and illustrated this species in his 1939 book A supplement to the butterflies and moths of New Zealand. In 1988 John S. Dugdale assigned this species to the genus Eudonia. The holotype specimen is held at the Natural History Museum, London.

== Description ==
Meyrick described the species as follows:

♂ 16 mm. Head, thorax grey mixed white. Palpi dark grey, apical edge white. Forewings elongate-triangular, termen slightly rounded, oblique; grey, costal and dorsal thirds suffusedly irrorated white; an irregular streak of black irroration beneath cell from base to end; a slenderer black streak in cell from middle to end, terminating in a white dot on angle of cell, and five rather irregular black lines on veins to termen, black dots on ends of terminal veins: cilia whitish-grey, a light grey subbasal line. Hindwings light grey; cilia pale grey, a darker subbasal shade.

The wing pattern of this species is variable and the holotype has strong dark longitudinal streaks on its forewings. Other specimens of this species have been confirmed through the comparison of male genitalia.

== Distribution ==
This species is endemic to New Zealand. For many years this species was only known from its type locality. However, in recent years it has been identified as a very locally common species of Northland and Auckland.

== Habitat ==
This species is known to inhabit gumland heaths.

== Conservation status ==
This species has been classified as having the "Data Deficient" conservation status under the New Zealand Threat Classification System.
