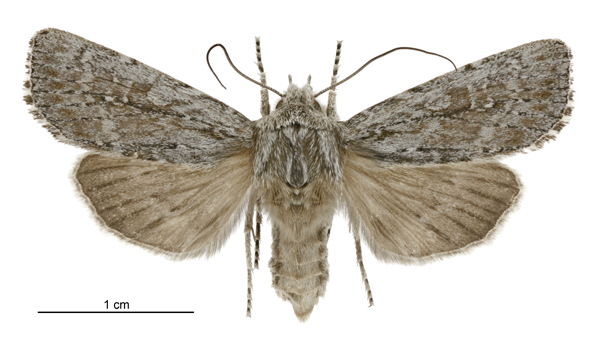
- Female
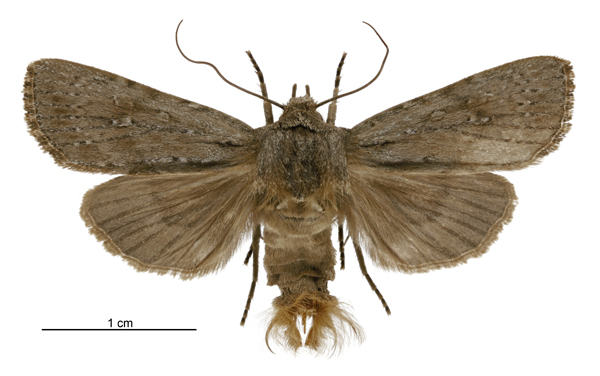
- Male

Scientific classification
- Kingdom: Animalia
- Phylum: Arthropoda
- Clade: Pancrustacea
- Class: Insecta
- Order: Lepidoptera
- Superfamily: Noctuoidea
- Family: Noctuidae
- Genus: Physetica
- Species: P. temperata

Binomial name
- Physetica temperata (Walker, 1858)

Synonyms
- Bryophila temperata Walker, 1858; Xylina inceptura Walker, 1858; Xylina deceptura Walker, 1858; Mamestra temperata (Walker, 1858); Melanchra temperata (Walker, 1858); Morrisonia temperata (Walker, 1858); Aletia accurata Philpott, 1917; Aletia eucrossa Meyrick, 1927

= Physetica temperata =

Species of moth endemic to New Zealand

Physetica temperata is a species of moth of the family Noctuidae. It is endemic to New Zealand and found in the North Island and the top of the South Island in coastal areas. P. temperata is unlikely to be confused with other species in its range, even though it is not distinctively patterned. It is possible that males might be confused with males of P. homoscia but this latter species is much larger. P. temperata can be distinguished from P. caerulea as the former species has forewing veins that are marked black and a chequered forewing fringe. The adults of this species are on the wing from September to March. The life history of this species has not been well documented although it is thought that larval host species is Ozothamnus leptophyllus.

== Taxonomy ==
This species was first described by Francis Walker in 1858 and named Bryophila temperata. In the same publication, Walker, thinking he was describing new species also named this species Xylina inceptura and Xylina deceptura. In 1887 Edward Meyrick synonymised these two latter names and placed the species in the name in the Mamestra. In 1898 George Hudson discussed this species under the name Leucania temperata. In 1905, George Hampson also discussed this species and placed it within the genus Morrisonia. In 1917 Alfred Philpott, thinking he was describing a new species, named it Aletia accurata. In 1927 Meyrick thinking he was describing a new species, named this species Aletia eucrossa. In 1928 Hudson again discussed this moth, but this time under the name Melanchra temperata. In 1988 J. S. Dugdale synonymised the names Aletia accurata and Aletia eucrossa, and placed this species in the genus Aletia. In 2017 Robert Hoare undertook a review of New Zealand Noctuinae and placed this species in the genus Physetica. The female holotype specimen was collected by J. F. Churton, likely in Auckland, and is held at the Natural History Museum, London.

== Description ==
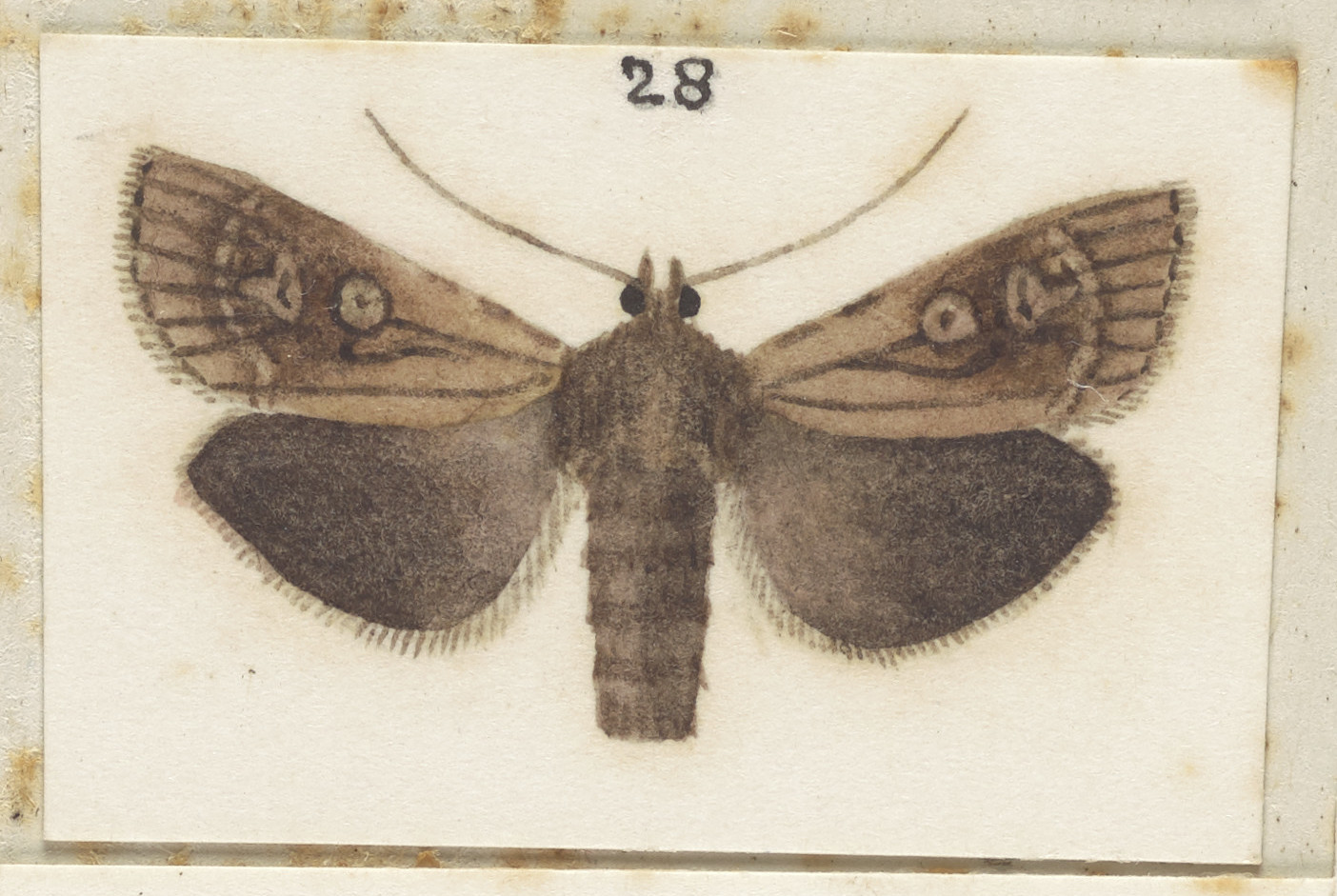
Male P. temperata illustrated by George Hudson.

Walker originally described this species as follows:

Male. Cinereous, somewhat paler beneath. Body stout. Third joint of the palpi porrect, linear, rounded at the tip, about half the length of the second. Wings shining, rather narrow. Fore wings slightly clouded, with darker cinereous in the disk, slightly marked with black along the cosla and on the veins; orbicular and reniforra marks slightly bordered with black; the former nearly elliptical; the latter oblong-subquadrate, hardly contracted in the middle; marginal points black; ciliae dark cinereous, with white streaks. Hind wings brownish cinereous, with white ciliae. Length of the body 5 lines; of the wings 14 lines.

The adult male of this species has a wingspan of between 30 and 32 mm whereas the female has a wingspan of between 32 and 35 mm. P. temperata is unlikely to be confused with other species in its range, even though it is not distinctively patterned. It is possible that males might be confused with males of P. homoscia but this latter species is much larger. P. temperata can be distinguished from P. caerulea as the former species has forewing veins that are marked black and a chequered forewing fringe.

== Distribution ==
This species is endemic to New Zealand. This species can be found in the North Island and in the north parts of the South Island.

== Habitat ==
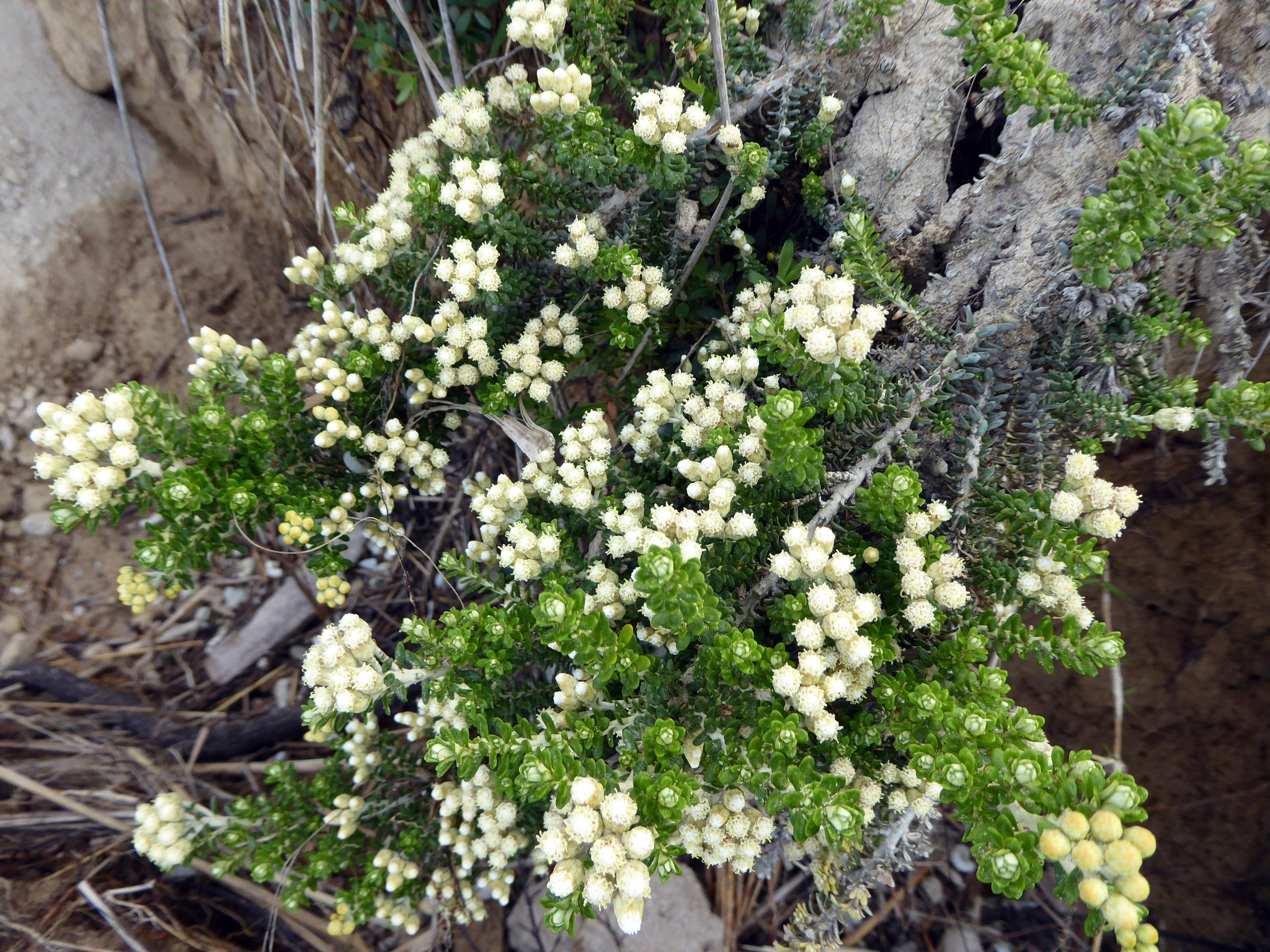
Ozothamnus leptophyllus, the likely larval host species of P. temperata.

This species lives in coastal habitats.

== Behaviour ==
The adults of this species are on the wing from September to March.

== Life history and host plants ==
The life history of this species has not been well documented although it is thought that larval host species is Ozothamnus leptophyllus.
