= Kumarahou =

Kumarahou is a Maori designation for various species of shrub. It may refer to:

- Olearia colensoi
- Pomaderris kumeraho
