= Rongoā =

Traditional Māori medicinal practices

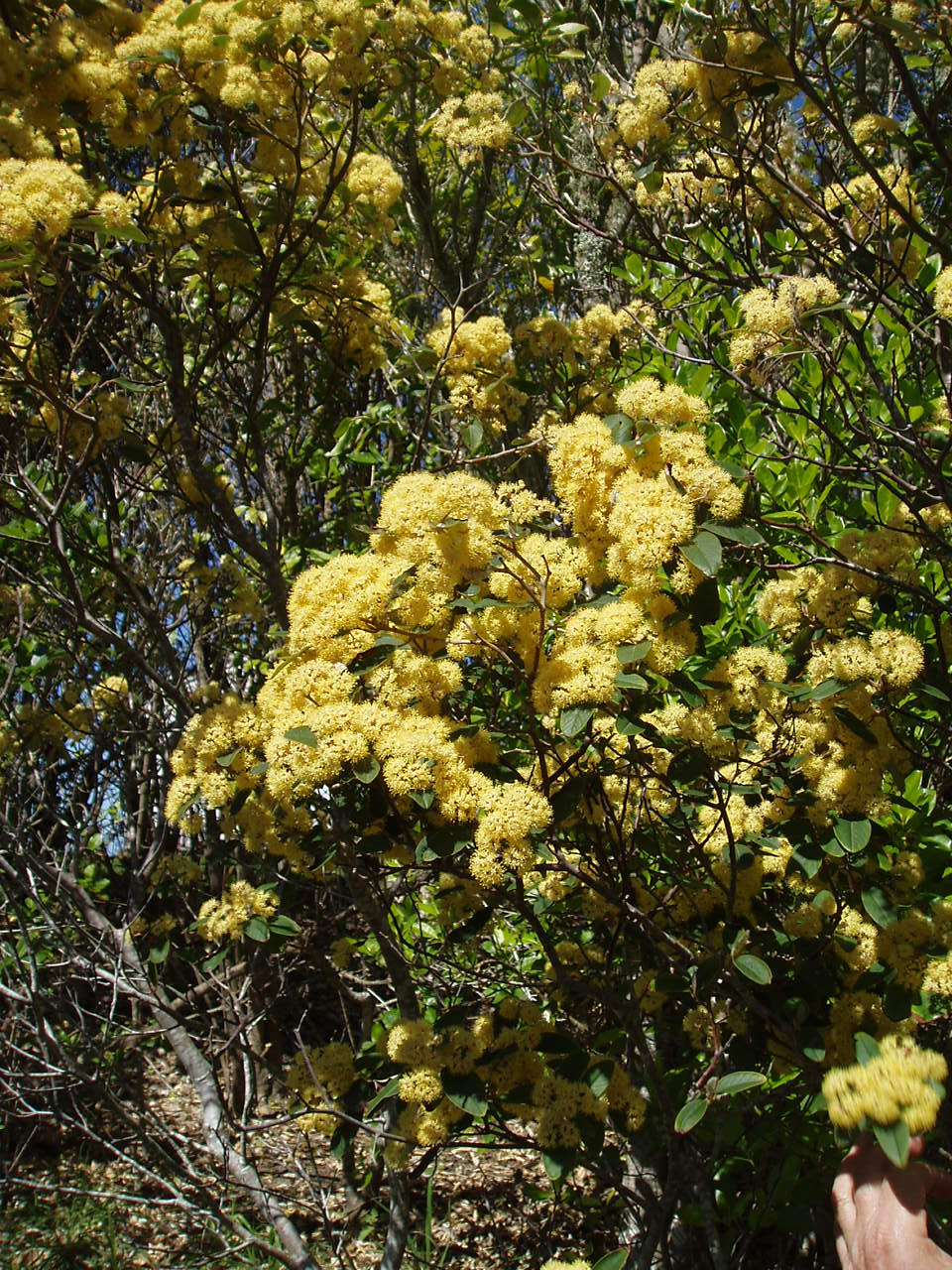
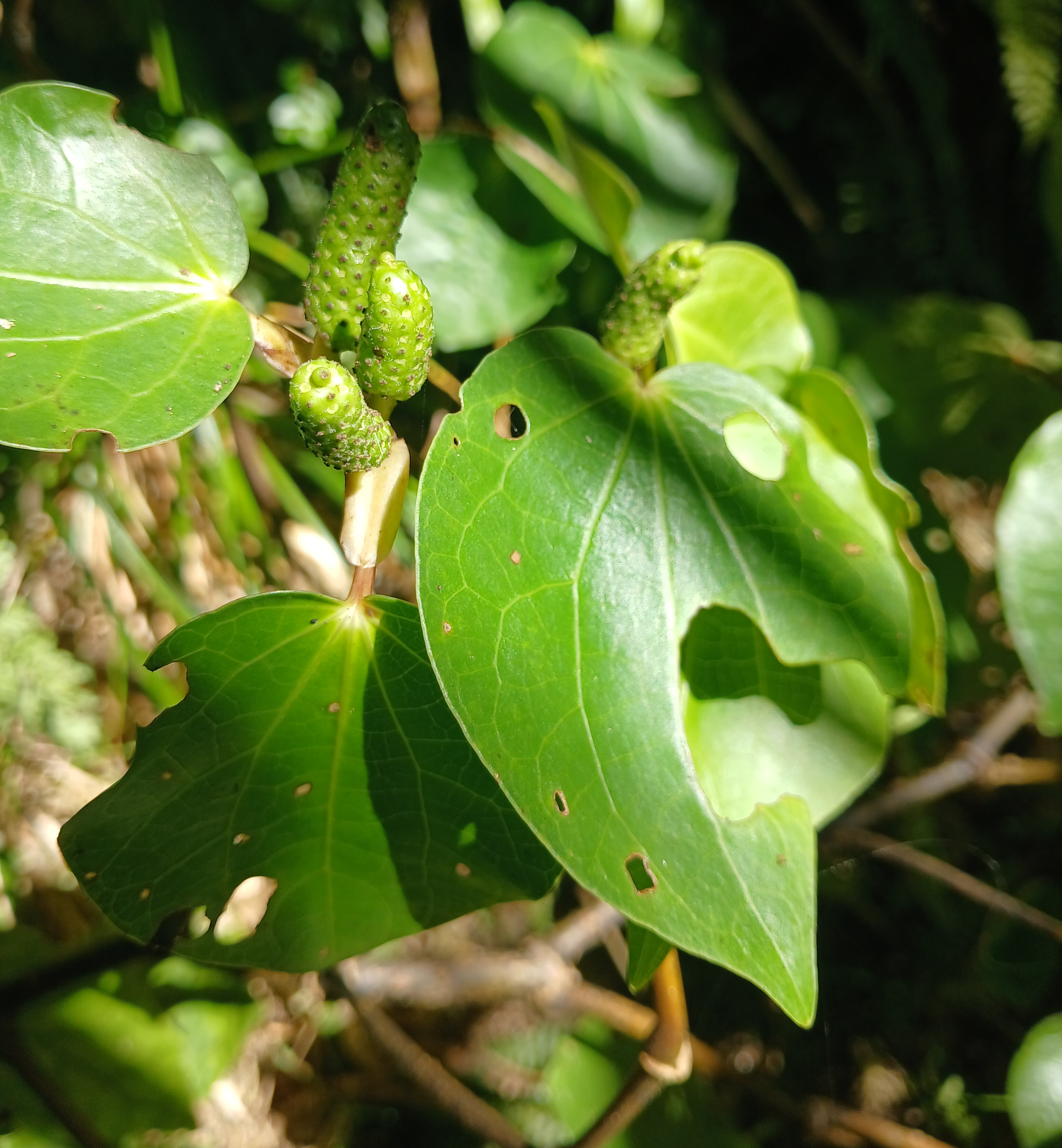
Native New Zealand plants such as kūmarahou (left) and kawakawa (right) are used as herbal medicine in rongoā Māori.

Rongoā (or rongoā Māori) refers to the traditional medicinal practices developed among the Māori in New Zealand. It encompasses herbal medicine, physical therapies, and spiritual practices rooted in Māori traditions and passed down through generations. Rongoā was one of the Māori cultural practices targeted by the suppression in the early part of the 20th century. The use of rongoā has seen a recent revival, with its recognition and integration into public healthcare systems.

== History ==
Rongoā traditional medicinal practices developed among the Māori based on their holistic understanding of hauora (health). It was traditionally taught orally by tohunga (experts) in whare wānanga.

Rongoā was one of the Māori cultural practices targeted by the Tohunga Suppression Act 1907. The ban was lifted by the Maori Welfare Act 1962. In the later part of the 20th century there was renewed interest in rongoā as part of a broader Māori renaissance. The practice of rongoā is regulated by the Therapeutics Products Bill only in the case of commercial or wholesale production, and the Māori continue to use rongoā just as they have done for generations. With its recognition and integration into public healthcare systems, including an official Rongoā Māori Action Plan by Health New Zealand, practitioners working alongside Western medicine in clinics and rehabilitation services have started adopting the same.

== Practice ==
Rongoā encompasses herbal medicine, physical therapies, and spiritual practices rooted in Māori traditions and passed down through generations. It can involve spiritual, herbal and physical components. Treatments may involve preparation of infusions, poultices, teas, and steam baths. Herbal aspects used plants such as harakeke, horopito, kawakawa, rātā, koromiko, kōwhai, kūmarahou, mānuka, pukatea and rimu. Mirimiri (light massage) and romiromi (deep tissue) were used to relieve musculoskeletal issues. It is also connected to the rites performed to ancestors and the land to address the spiritual imbalance.
