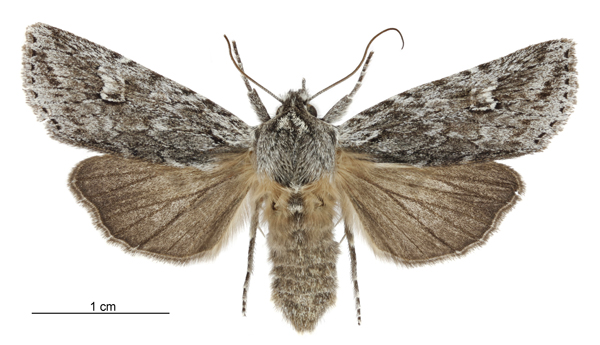
- Female
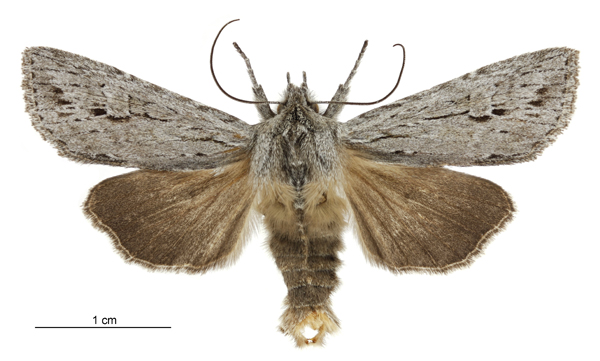
- Male

Scientific classification
- Kingdom: Animalia
- Phylum: Arthropoda
- Clade: Pancrustacea
- Class: Insecta
- Order: Lepidoptera
- Superfamily: Noctuoidea
- Family: Noctuidae
- Genus: Physetica
- Species: P. sequens

Binomial name
- Physetica sequens (Howes, 1912)

Synonyms
- Morrisonia sequens Howes, 1912; Melanchra distracta Meyrick, 1924; Melanchra sequens (Howes, 1912); Graphania sequens (Howes, 1912)

= Physetica sequens =

Species of moth endemic to New Zealand

Physetica sequens is a species of moth of the family Noctuidae. It is endemic to New Zealand and can be found throughout the North and South Islands. It appears to be more common in the North Island than the South Island, and lives in open native shrublands, peatlands, Northland gumland, inland volcanic dunes, and Dracophyllum-dominated areas at altitudes that range from sea level to the alpine zone, up to at least 1600 m. Larvae of this species have been successfully reared on Leucopogon fasciculatus and Leptecophylla juniperina. The adults of this species are variable in appearance and are on the wing from September to March. P. sequens is similar in appearance to P. phricias but can be distinguished as P. phricias has a narrow black line along the dorsum of its forewing that P. sequens does not. P. sequens is also similar in appearance to P. cucullina however the forewing dorsum area of P. sequens does not have the narrow black line that is frequently present on P. cucullina forewings.

== Taxonomy ==
This species was first described by George Howes in 1912 using specimens collected by George Blundell Longstaff at Whakarewarewa and named the species Morrisonia sequens. In 1924 Edward Meyrick, thinking he was describing a new species, named this moth Melanchra distracta. In 1928 George Hudson discussed and illustrated this species under the name Melanchra sequens. He also discussed Melanchra distracta, also thinking it a separate species. In 1988 J. S. Dugdale placed this species in the genus Graphania and at the same time synonymised Melanchra distracta into that name. In 2017 Robert Hoare undertook a review of New Zealand Noctuinae and placed this species in the genus Physetica. While reviewing this species Hoare designated a lectotype specimen, held at the Natural History Museum, London. The Auckland War Memorial Museum hold a paralectotype specimen of this species.

== Description ==
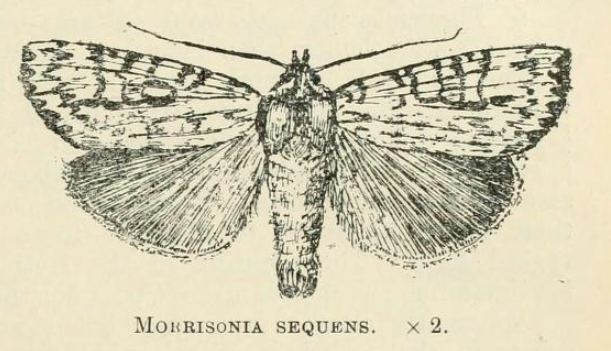
P. sequens as illustrated by George Howes in his original description.

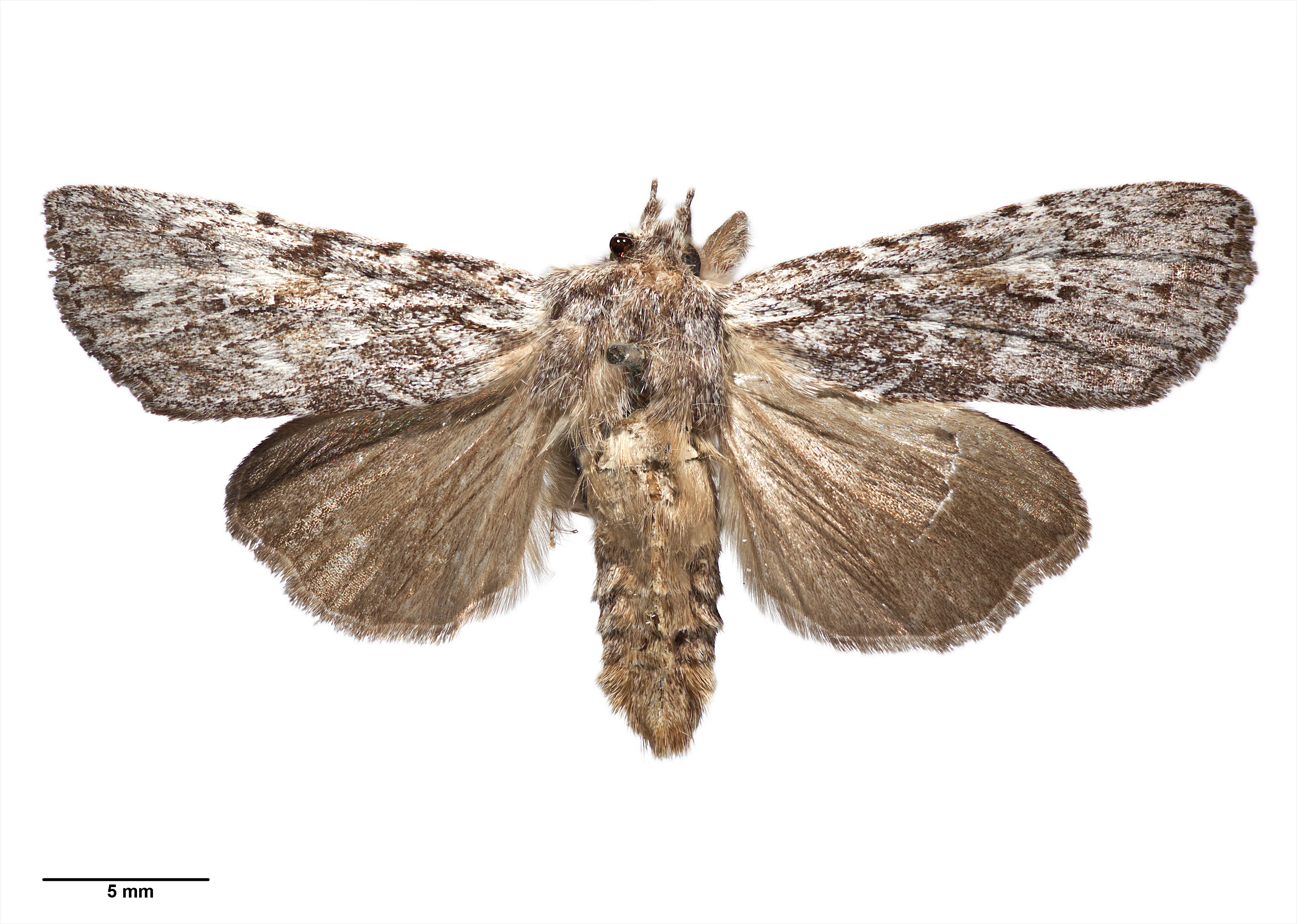
Female paralectotype specimen of Physetica sequens AMNZ21784 held at the Auckland Museum.

Hoare describes the larva of this species as follows:

dull green with brown and grey dorsal markings.

Howes described the adults of this species as follows:

♂, 31 mm.; ♀, 34 mm. Head and thorax grey, strongly crested. Antennae filiform. Abdomen ochreous grey, crests slight. Forewings bright grey, irrorated with fuscous. A jagged subbasal line, strongly marked on submedian fold, where it turns abruptly towards base. A dark line across wing at 1/3, double, space between double lines grey (not irrorated), a dark mark on costa at 1/2, followed by two more above reniform. Subterminal line faint and suffused. A terminal series of black points; a few dark points outline veins. Orbicular faint, but with a well-defined line along lower edge. Reniform defined by a dark line below and on terminal edge. Cilia grey, mixed with fuscous. Hind -wings brown, darker towards termen. Cilia brown, with fine paler line at base. Tips grey-white.

The adult wingspan of the male P. sequens is between 31 and 42 mm and for the female is between 32.5 and 44 mm. This species is variable in appearance with larger specimens being found in Tongariro National Park. However although these examples have less prominently underlined reniform stigma, Hoare considered them falling within the same species as there were no other distinguishing characteristics that might support separating them off. P. sequens is similar in appearance to P. phricias but can be distinguished as P. phricias has a narrow black line along the dorsum of its forewing that P. sequens does not. P. sequens is also similar in appearance to P. cucullina however the forewing dorsum area of the former species does not have the narrow black line that is frequently present on P. cucullina forewings.

== Distribution ==
This species is endemic to New Zealand. It can be found throughout the North and South Islands.

== Habitat ==
This species lives in open native shrublands, peatlands, Northland gumland, inland volcanic dunes, and Dracophyllum-dominated areas at altitudes that range from sea level to the alpine zone, up to at least 1600 m. This species appears to be more common in the North Island than the South Island.

== Behaviour ==
Adults are on the wing from September to March.

== Biology and host species ==
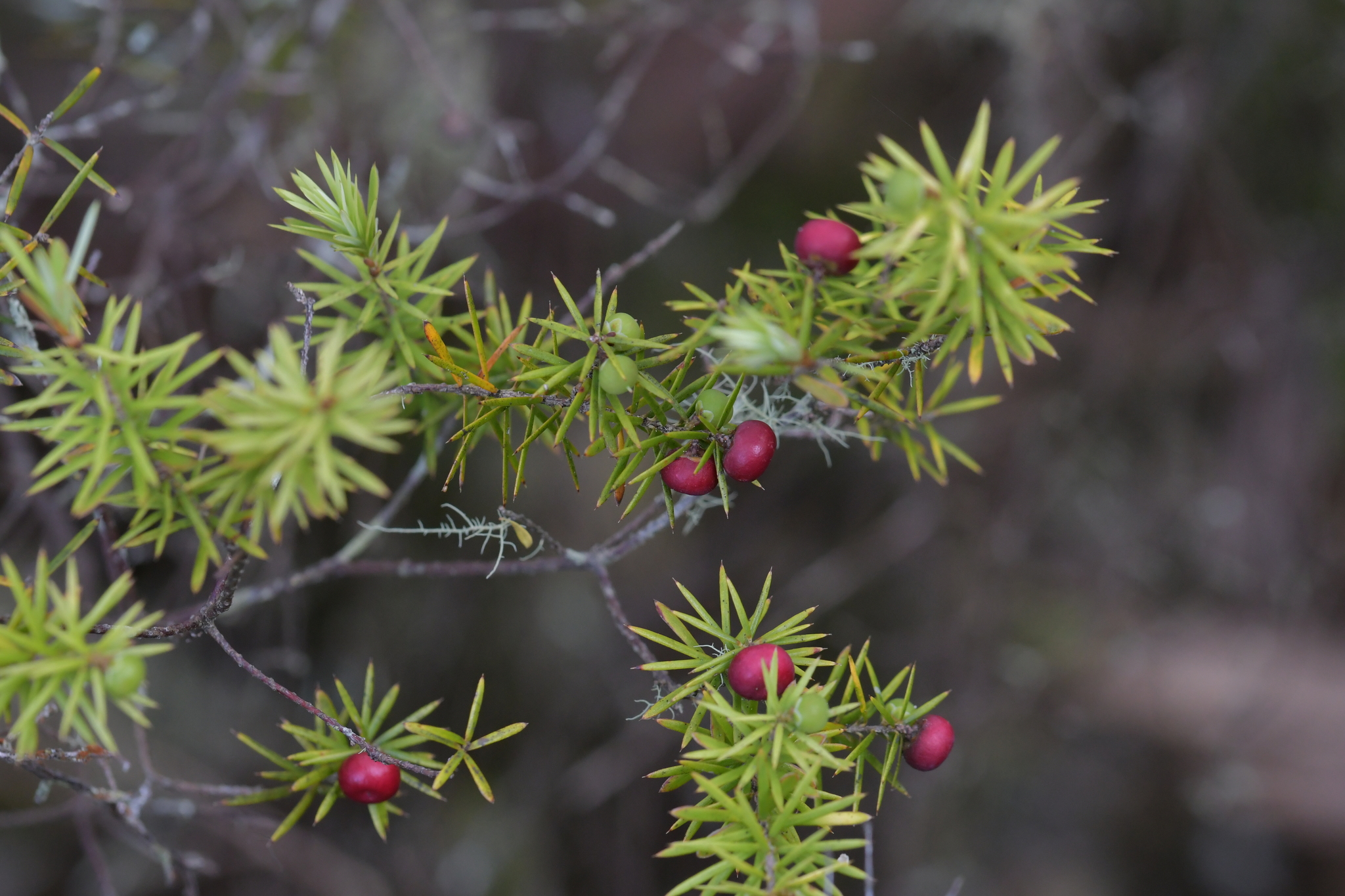
Leptecophylla juniperina, a larval host species of P. sequens.

Larvae of this species have been successfully reared on Leucopogon fasciculatus and Leptecophylla juniperina. Adults of P. sequens have been witnessed feeding on the flowers of as well as pollinating Dracophyllum acerosum.
