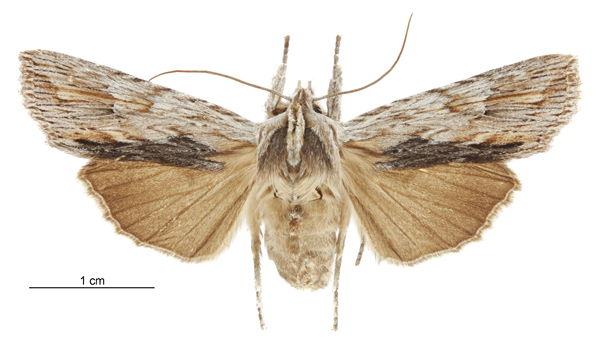
- Female
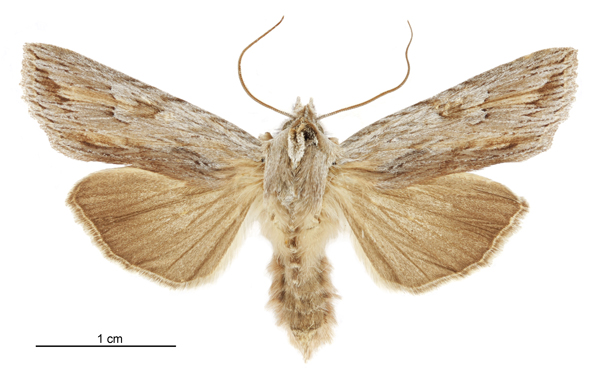
- Male

Scientific classification
- Kingdom: Animalia
- Phylum: Arthropoda
- Class: Insecta
- Order: Lepidoptera
- Superfamily: Noctuoidea
- Family: Noctuidae
- Genus: Physetica
- Species: P. prionistis

Binomial name
- Physetica prionistis (Meyrick, 1887)

Synonyms
- Mamestra prionistis Meyrick, 1887; Melanchra prionistis (Meyrick, 1887); Graphania prionistis (Meyrick, 1887)

= Physetica prionistis =

Species of moth endemic to New Zealand

Physetica prionistis is a moth of the family Noctuidae. It was described by Edward Meyrick in 1887. It is endemic to New Zealand and is widespread throughout the North, South and Chatham Islands. This species can be found in open clearings of shrubland and forest at altitudes from sea level up to the alpine zone. Adults are on the wing throughout the year and are attracted to sugar traps and occasionally to light. The life history of this species is unknown as are the larval host species.

== Taxonomy ==
This species was first described by Edward Meyrick in 1887 and named Mamestra prionistis. In 1898 George Hudson discussed this species under the name Melanchra prionistis. In 1928 Hudson again discussed the species under the same name. In 1988 J. S. Dugdale placed this species in the genus Graphania. In 2017 Robert Hoare undertook a review of New Zealand Noctuinae and placed this species in the genus Physetica. The lectotype specimen was collected by Richard William Fereday in Rakaia and held at the Natural History Museum, London.

== Description ==
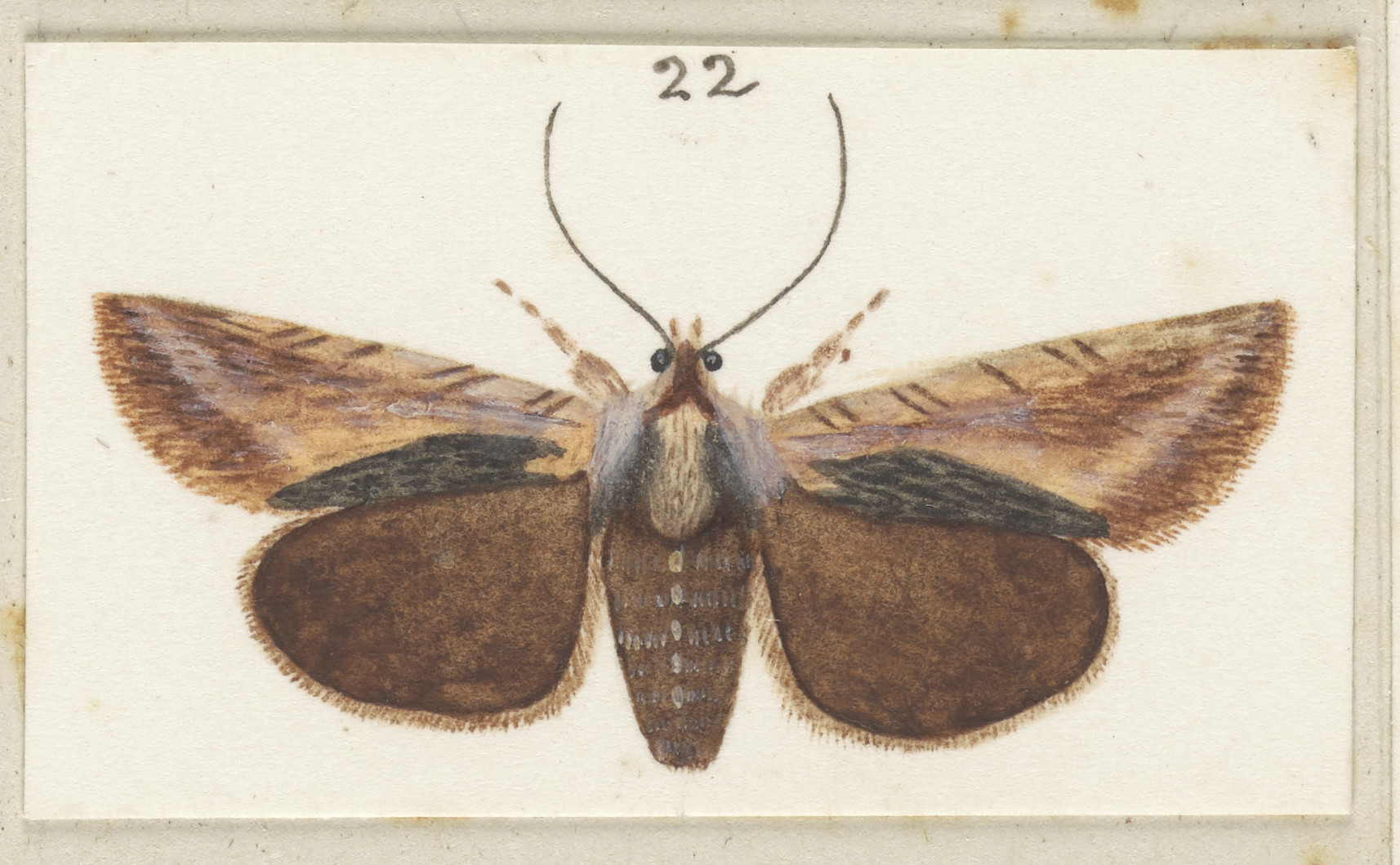
Illustration by George Hudson of P. prionistis.

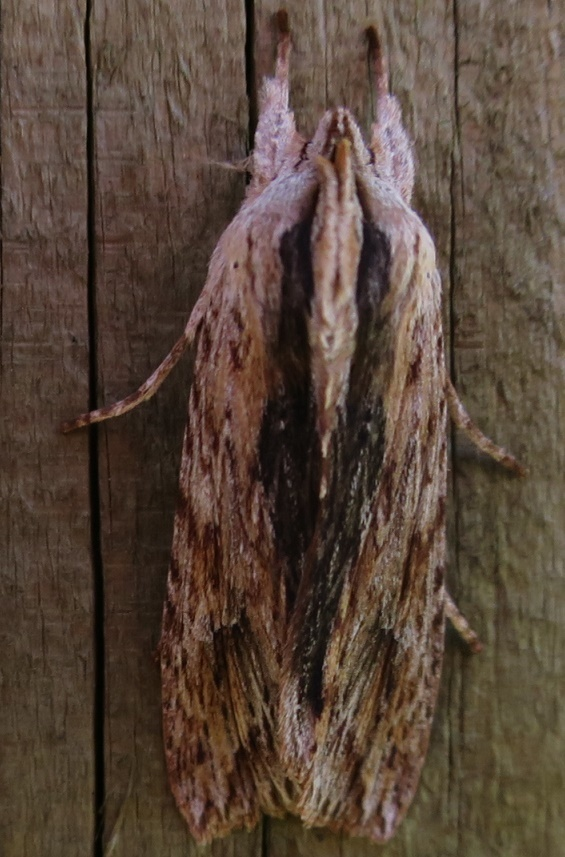
Observation of living P. prionistis

Meyrick described the species as follows:

Male. — 45 mm. Head, palpi, thorax, and legs grey-whitish; crown with two brown lines meeting in front; palpi with second joint externally brown; thorax with large anterior crest, two brown dorsal lines meeting in front, diverging and very indistinct posteriorly. Antennae grey, filiform, moderately ciliated. Abdomen grey, sides and anal tuft paler, and ochreous-tinged. Forewings moderately dilated, costa straight, apex obtuse, hind-margin crenulate, obliquely rounded; pale ochreous-grey, densely and suffusedly irrorated with white, tending to form longitudinal streaks; inner margin suffused with brownish; lines hardly traceable, strongly dentate; reniform narrow, white, anteriorly suffused, posteriorly edged with an interrupted blackish line; subterminal indicated by a posterior brownish dentate margin, diverted to hindmargin below apex : cilia ochreous-grey, mixed with white. Hindwings rather dark grey; cilia whitish, with a grey line.

The adult male of this species has a wingspan of between 37 and 45 mm and the female of between 39 and 43 mm. This species is distinctive as it has a white central stripe down its thorax and the darker stripe of colour along the back part of the forewing.

== Distribution ==
This species is endemic to New Zealand and is widespread throughout the North, South and Chatham Islands. This species is regarded as being rare in most locations however it has been found to be common at Mount Te Aroha.

== Habitat ==
This species is found in open clearings of shrubland and forest at altitudes from sea level up to the alpine zone (at least 1850 m).

== Behaviour ==
This species is on the wing throughout the year and are attracted to sugar traps and occasionally to light. This species can sometimes be found during the day resting on trees, where it is camouflaged by its colouring.

== Life history and host species ==
The life history of this species is unknown as are the larval host species. The larvae of this species have yet to be found.
