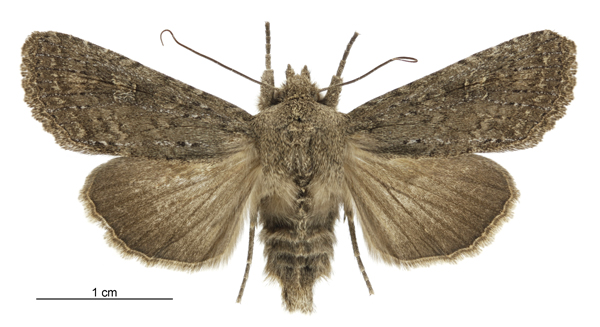
- Female
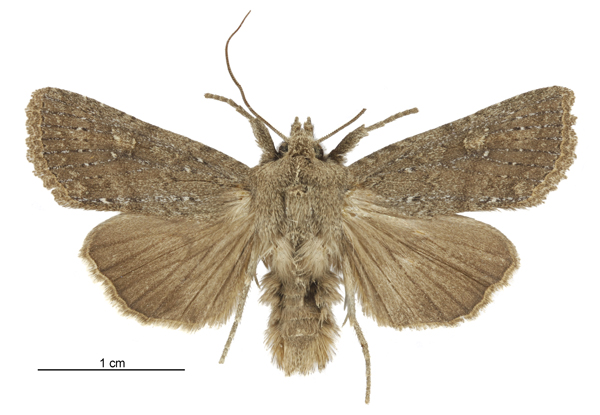
- Male

Scientific classification
- Kingdom: Animalia
- Phylum: Arthropoda
- Class: Insecta
- Order: Lepidoptera
- Superfamily: Noctuoidea
- Family: Noctuidae
- Genus: Physetica
- Species: P. homoscia

Binomial name
- Physetica homoscia (Meyrick, 1887)

Synonyms
- Mamestra homoscia Meyrick, 1887; Melanchra homoscia (Meyrick, 1887); Hyssia sminthistis Hampson, 1905; Graphania homoscia (Meyrick, 1887)

= Physetica homoscia =

Species of moth endemic to New Zealand

Physetica homoscia is a species of moth of the family Noctuidae. It is endemic to New Zealand and is found throughout the country, including the Auckland Islands. This species inhabits areas where its host plants are common, and this includes costal dune habitats. It lives at a wide range of altitudes, from sea-level to at least 1750 m. The larvae of P. homoscia feed on Ozothamnus leptophyllus and Ozothamnus vauvilliersii. They are very active and drop to the ground when disturbed. Larvae are parasitised by a species of fly. This species pupates in the soil, and the pupa life stage lasts approximately 6 weeks. The adult moths are on the wing from September to June and are attracted to light. The adults of P. homoscia might possibly be confused with Ichneutica moderata however this latter species lacks the small white dots on the forewing veins of P. homoscia. Adults might also be confused with P. temperata but P. homoscia is significantly larger in size.

== Taxonomy ==
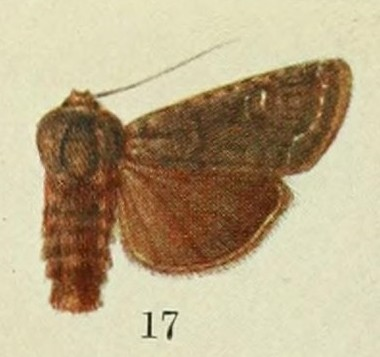
Illustration of Hampson's Hyssia sminthistis

This species was first described by Edward Meyrick in 1887 and named Mamestra homoscia. In 1898, George Hudson placed this species in the genus Melanchra. George Hampson, thinking he was describing a new species, named this moth Hyssia sminthistis in 1905. Meyrick synonymised this latter name into Melanchra homoscia. In 1971, J. S. Dugdale placed this species in the genus Graphania. In 1988, Dugdale confirmed this placement in his Catalogue of New Zealand Lepidoptera. In 2017, Robert Hoare undertook a review of New Zealand Noctuinae and placed this species in the genus Physetica. The male holotype specimen was collected by George Hudson in Wellington and is held at the Natural History Museum, London.

== Description ==
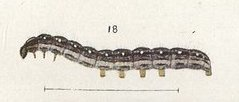
Illustration of the larva of P. homoscia by George Hudson.

Dugdale described the larva of this species as follows:

Body colour pattern in black and yellowish or greenish brown, variegated. Dorsal area longitudinally, darkly marbled, seta D1 on a small, and D2 on a large white patch, the D2 patch connected with a prominent pallid subdorsal line; zone between this and spiracle longitudinally marbled; spiracle on a dark patch, subspiracular line broadest behind, narrowest just in front of spiracle; subventral and ventral zones pallid, obscurely marbled; ventral line obscure to prominent.

Meyrick originally described the species as follows:

Male. — 38 mm. Head, palpi, antennae, thorax, abdomen, and legs grey; antennae with short triangular transverse dentations (1/2), strongly ciliated; thorax with moderate anterior crest; anal tuft ochreous-tinged. Forewings moderately dilated, costa almost straight, apex obtuse, hindmargin crenulate, obliquely with two tolerably distinct series of white dots, preceded and followed by black marks, before first and beyond second lines; lines dark-margined, tolerably defined; orbicular and claviform hardly traceable; reniform indicated by whitish lateral margins; subterminal faintly paler, not dark-margined, waved: cilia grey. Hindwings grey, darker posteriorly; cilia grey-whitish, with a cloudy grey line.

The wingspan of the adult male is between 29.5 and 43 mm, and the adult female is between 35 and 46 mm. P. homoscia has a plain brown coloured forewing, and older specimens can possibly be confused with Ichneutica moderata. However, this latter species lacks the small white dots on the forewing veins found in the forewings of P. homoscia. It might also be confused with P. temperata; however, P. homoscia is significantly larger in size.

== Distribution ==
This species is endemic to New Zealand. It is found throughout New Zealand, including in the Auckland Islands.

== Habitat ==
This species inhabits places where its host plants are common, and this includes costal dune habitat. It lives at a wide range of altitudes, from sea level to at least 1750 m.

== Behaviour ==
The larvae are very active and drop to the ground when disturbed. The adult moths are on the wing from September to June and are attracted to light.

== Life history and host species ==
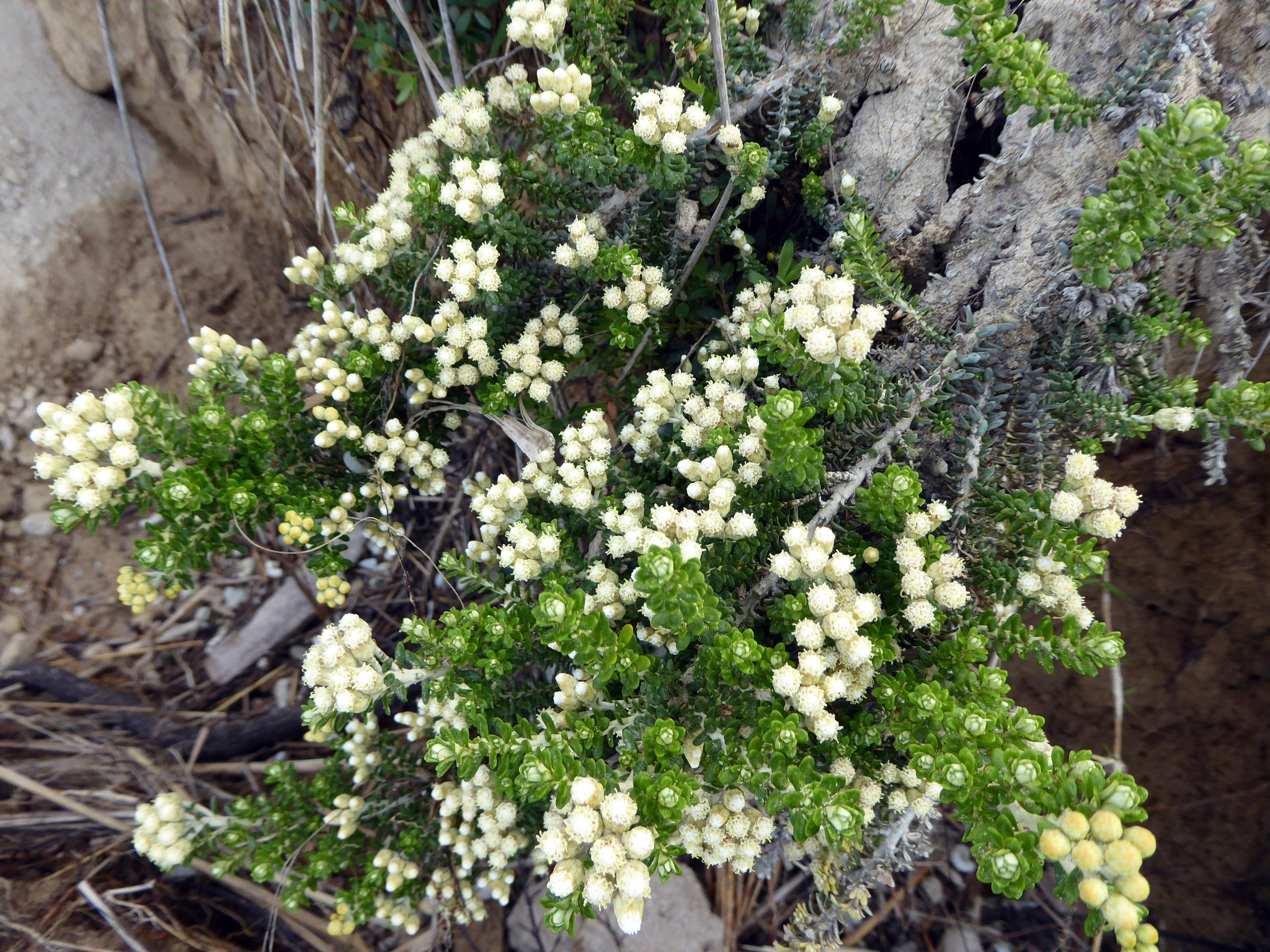
Ozothamnus leptophyllus, a larval host species of P. homoscia.'

Larvae of P. homoscia feed on Ozothamnus leptophyllus and Ozothamnus vauvilliersii. Hudson states that the larvae are parasitised by a fly species. The larvae pupate in the soil, and the pupa life stage lasts for approximately 6 weeks.
