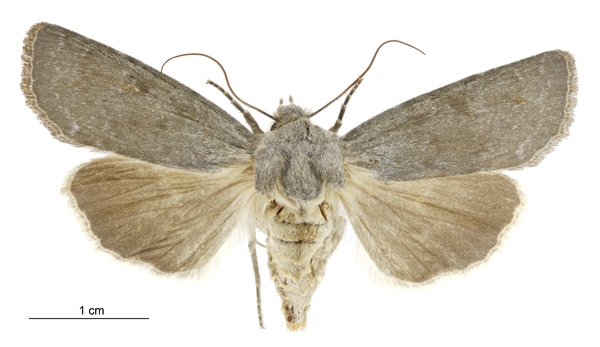
- Female Physetica caerulea

Scientific classification
- Kingdom: Animalia
- Phylum: Arthropoda
- Class: Insecta
- Order: Lepidoptera
- Superfamily: Noctuoidea
- Family: Noctuidae
- Subfamily: Noctuinae
- Genus: Physetica; Meyrick, 1887

= Physetica =

Genus of moths

Physetica is a genus of moths of the family Noctuidae. This genus is endemic to New Zealand.

== Taxonomy ==
This genus was first described by Edward Meyrick in 1887. In 2017 Robert Hoare undertook a revision of New Zealand Noctuinae and expanded the species included in this genus.

== Distribution ==
Species in this genus are only found in New Zealand.

== Conservation status ==
None of the species contained within this genus are regarded as being threatened.

== Species ==
The following species are found within the genus:

- Physetica caerulea (Guenée, 1868)
- Physetica cucullina (Guenée, 1868)
- Physetica funerea (Philpott, 1927)
- Physetica homoscia (Meyrick, 1887)
- Physetica longstaffi (Howes, 1911)
- Physetica phricias (Meyrick, 1888)
- Physetica prionistis (Meyrick, 1887)
- Physetica sequens (Howes, 1912)
- Physetica temperata (Walker, 1858)
