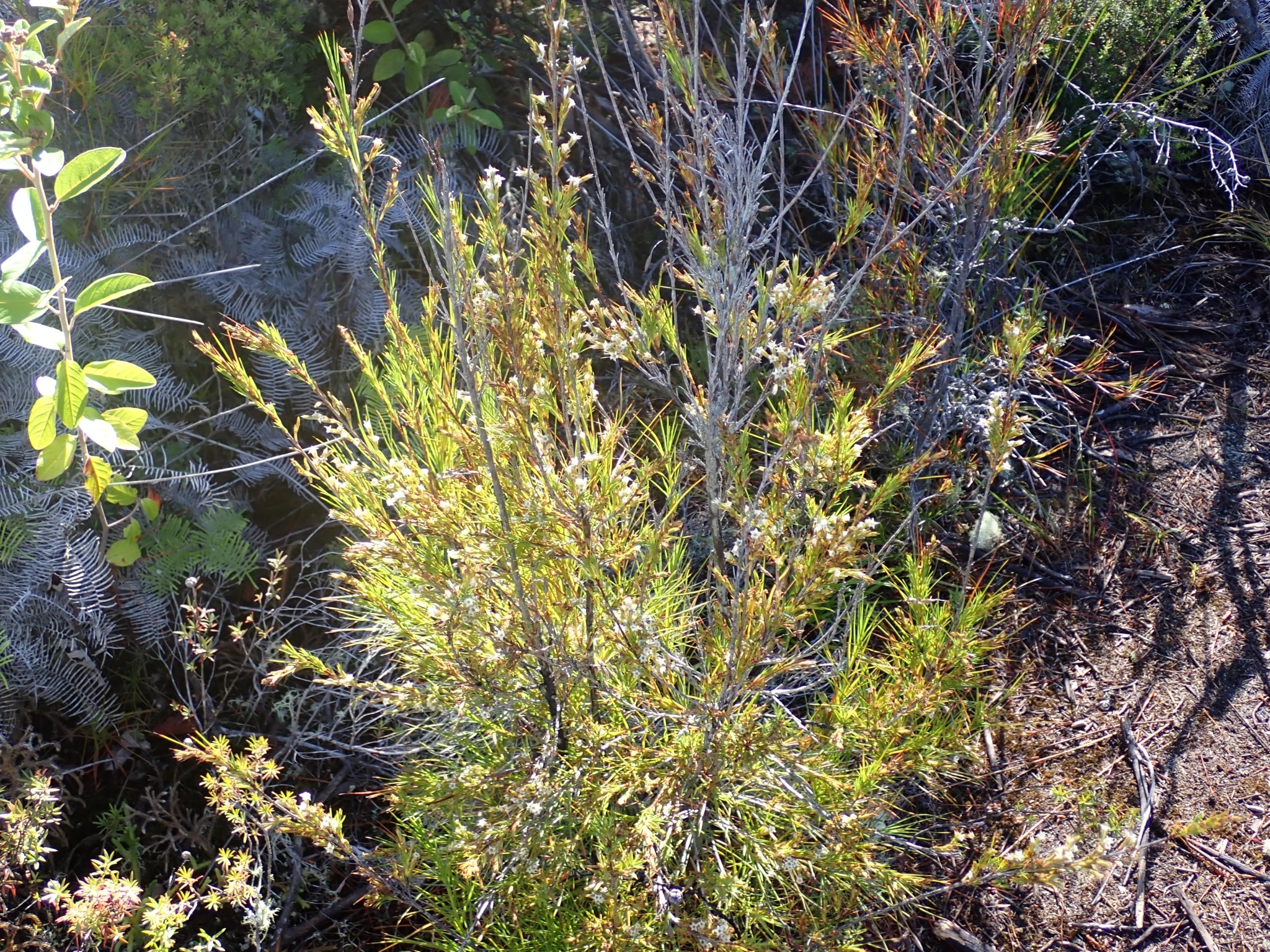
- Dracophyllum lessonianum growing near Lake Kaiiwi, Northland

Scientific classification
- Kingdom: Plantae
- Clade: Tracheophytes
- Clade: Angiosperms
- Clade: Eudicots
- Clade: Asterids
- Order: Ericales
- Family: Ericaceae
- Genus: Dracophyllum
- Subgenus: Dracophyllum subg. Oreothamnus
- Species: D. lessonianum

Binomial name
- Dracophyllum lessonianum A.Rich.

= Dracophyllum lessonianum =

Species of flowering plant in the heath family

Dracophyllum lessonianum is a species of tree or shrub in the heath family Ericaceae. It is endemic to the northern North Island of New Zealand. It occurs as far south as Kopuatai Peat Dome and Kawhia Harbour, but is very uncommon south of about Dargaville and Whangārei.

D. lessonianum usually grows in gumland scrub or on peat, and sometimes in the upper parts of salt marsh. It has no vernacular name that is used commonly in either English or Māori. Both Dracophyllum lessonianum and Dracophyllum sinclairii have been called gumland grass tree, but this is a contrived name.

D. lessonianum was first described by the French botanist Achille Richard in 1832.

== Gallery ==
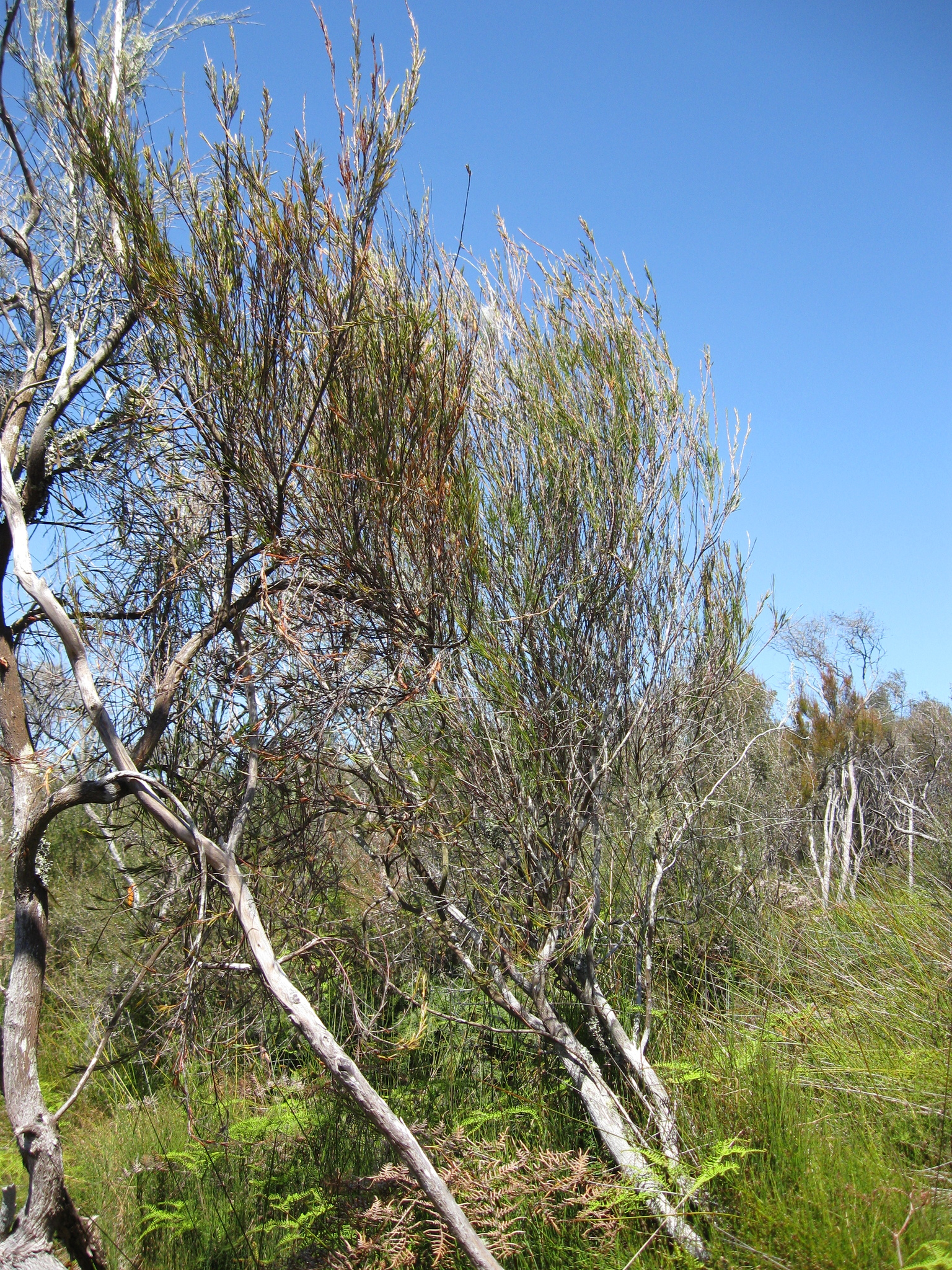
Dracophyllum lessonianum in Awaiti, Waikato Region

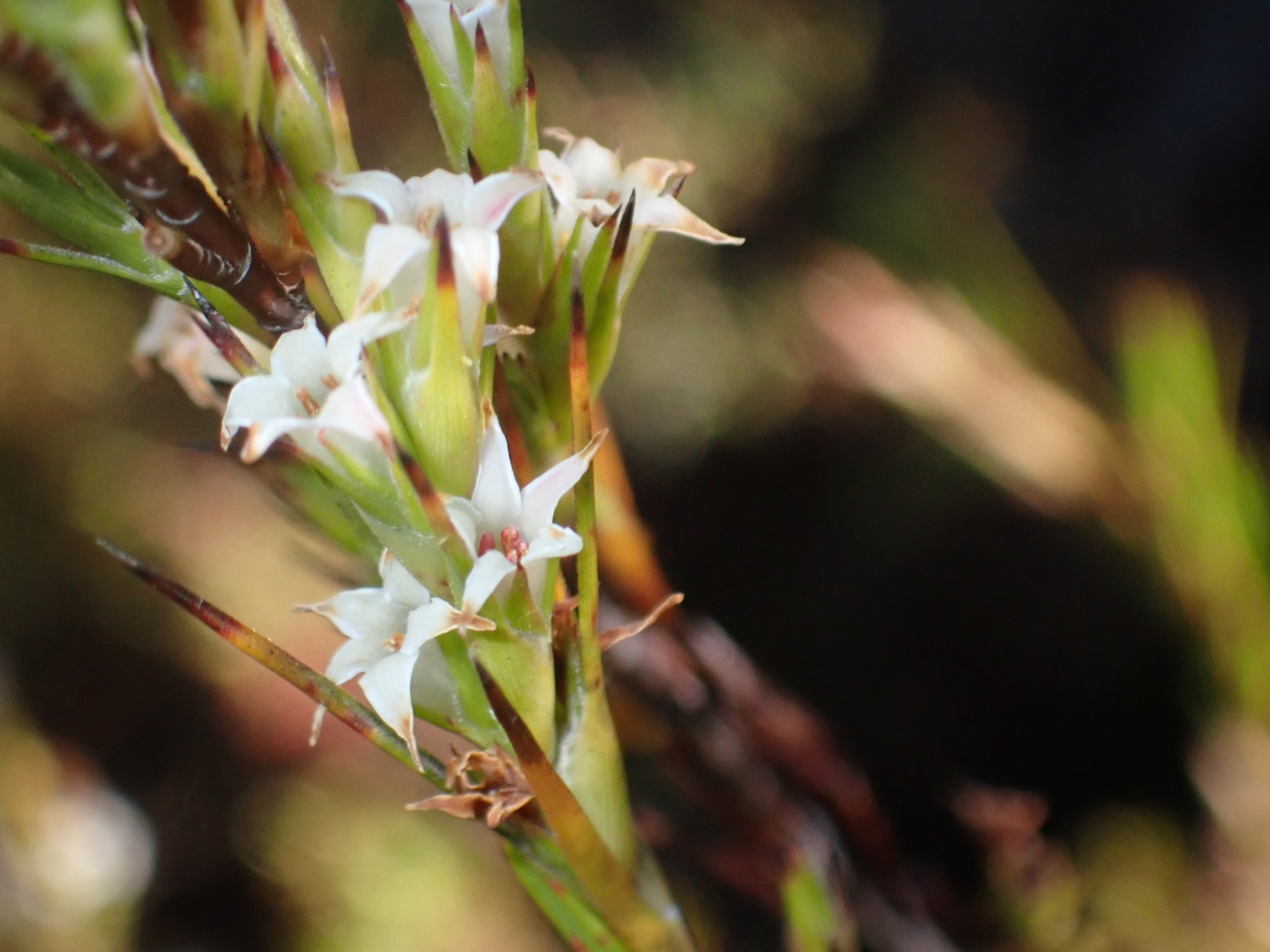
Flowers of Dracophyllum lessonianum

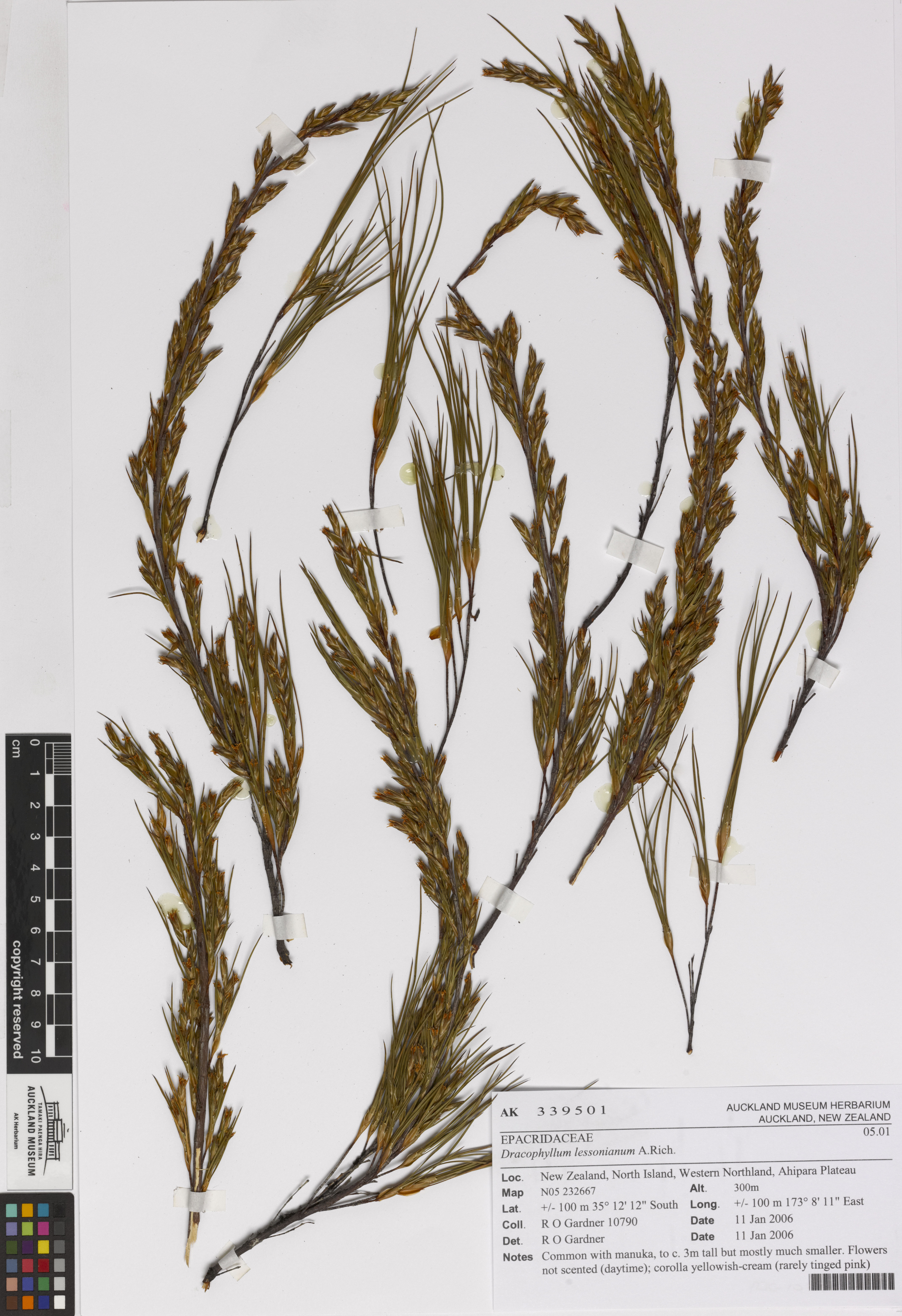
Herbarium specimen from the Auckland War Memorial Museum
