= Gumland =

Biome in New Zealand

- Wetland
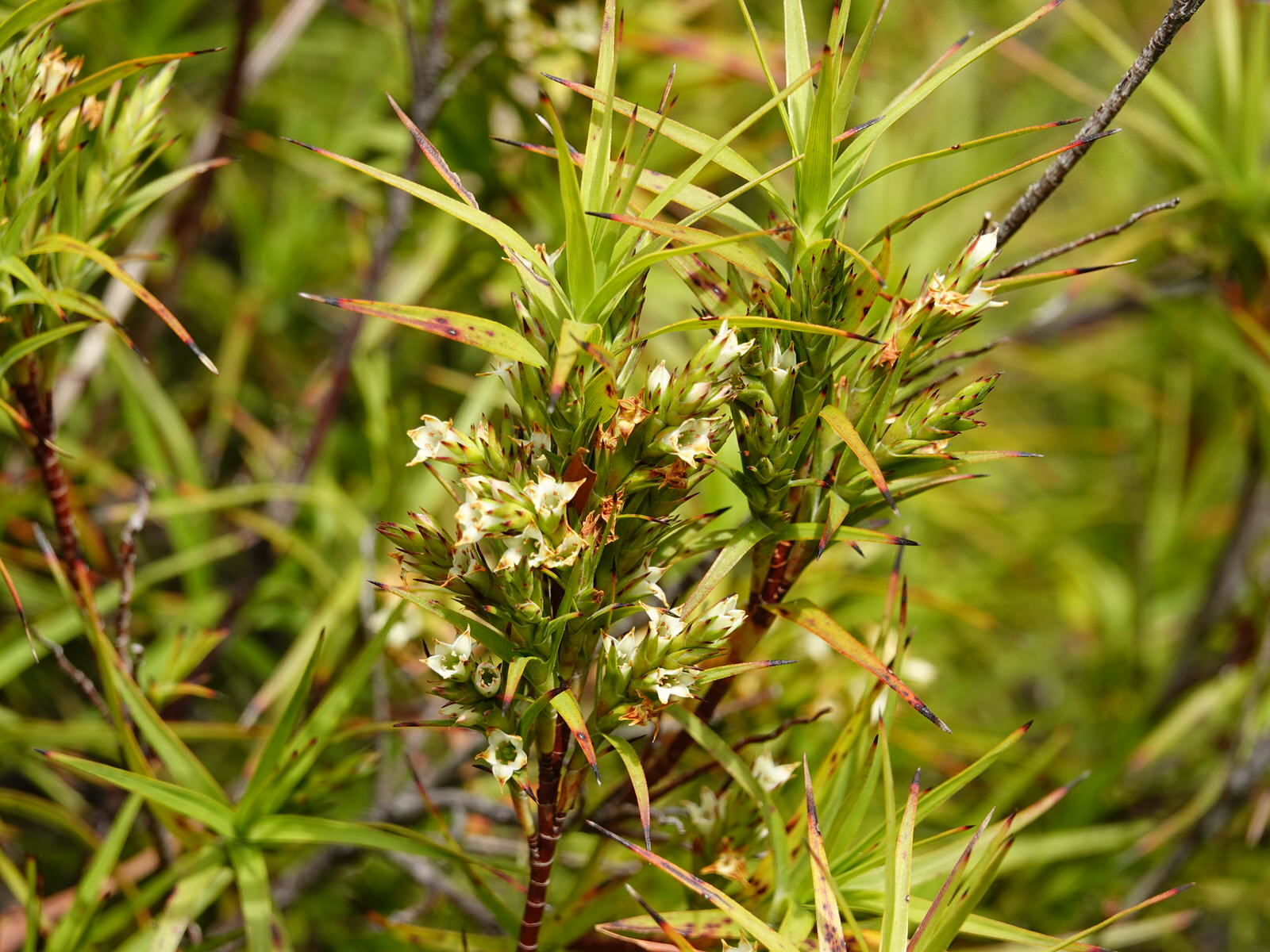
- Gumland grass tree (Dracophyllum sinclairii)

Ecology
- Realm: Australasian

Geography
- Country: New Zealand
- Soil types: Podzol

Conservation
- Conservation status: Critically Endangered

Gumland is a scrubby wetland ecosystem that grows in low-nutrient and acidic soils on land that was once covered in kauri (Agathis australis) forest in the northern regions of New Zealand. The gumland ecosystem is a type of heath, containing plants, many of them rare, that are adapted to infertile and harsh conditions. Gumlands are found in Northland and the Auckland Region of the North Island. They are known for having kauri gum in the soil. Gumland ecosystems are critically endangered.

== Description ==
Gumland is a scrubby wetland ecosystem that is a type of heathland. They grow on some of the least fertile and most acidic soils, and are typically found on flat or rolling land that was once covered in kauri (Agathis australis) forest. The soils have lower levels of nutrients than soils in similar heathland in South Africa and Australia. Strongly leached soil has formed from weathering of claystones, sand and sandstones. The soil has changed over thousands of years, with the combination of the weathering and the acidic kauri leaf litter creating a distinct soil type known as podzol. This soil type has limited drainage and can remain wet for extended periods. Gumlands are not always recognised as wetlands, as they can be found on hilltops, staying dry all through summer but becoming waterlogged in winter. Gumlands are named for having kauri gum in their soil.

== Distribution ==
Gumlands occur only in Northland and the Auckland Region, in the North Island. The only remaining true gumland in Auckland is at Waikumete Cemetery. The extent of gumlands probably increased after the arrival of Māori and European people, due to loss of forest through increased fire activity, and also removal of soil. The largest remaining area of gumland, on the Ahipara plateau, experiences frequent fires, but mānuka (Leptospermum scoparium) regenerates rapidly.

== Biodiversity ==
=== Flora ===
47% of the native vascular flora of the gumlands are endemic species; 53% are also native to Australia. The most dominant species is mānuka. Other plants that can be abundant include kūmarahou (Pomaderris kumeraho), heath shrubs such as gumland grass tree (Dracophyllum lessonianum), tall mingimingi (Leucopogon fasciculatus) and Epacris pauciflora, ferns, especially tangle fern (Gleichenia dicarpa), and sedges, especially bog schoenus (Schoenus brevifolius) and Baumea. Threatened species in this ecosystem include king fern (Todea barbara), and numerous orchids, including mauve sun orchid (Thelymitra malvina) and the domed sun orchid (Thelymitra tholiformis).

=== Fauna ===
Fauna in gumlands include the black mudfish (Neochanna diversus), the Northland mudfish (Neochanna heleios), the Northland green gecko, the North Island brown kiwi and the New Zealand fernbird. Over 160 species of Lepidoptera (butterflies and moths) have been found on gumlands, with several undescribed taxa that have not been found anywhere else.

== Threats ==
Gumlands are a critically endangered ecosystem. They once covered 300,000 hectares of land in the 1840s, though most have been used for farmland, so only a few patches remain. There many other threats, including climate change, human use of land, and gum-diggers recovering kauri gum from the soil. Weeds are also an issue for the gumland patches left.
