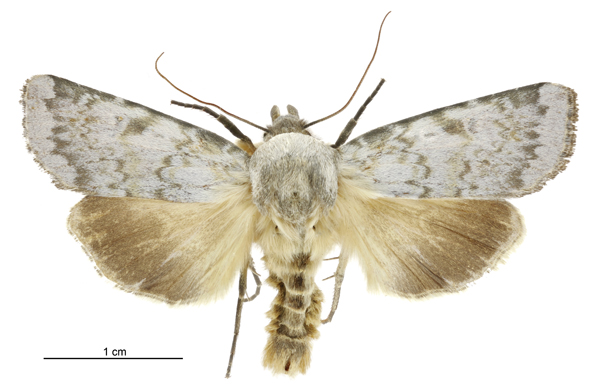
- Male
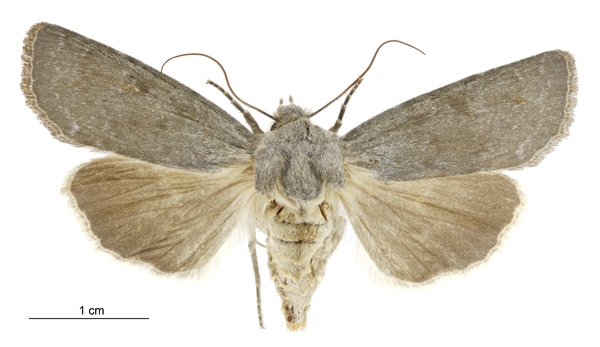
- Female

Scientific classification
- Domain: Eukaryota
- Kingdom: Animalia
- Phylum: Arthropoda
- Class: Insecta
- Order: Lepidoptera
- Superfamily: Noctuoidea
- Family: Noctuidae
- Genus: Physetica
- Species: P. caerulea

Binomial name
- Physetica caerulea (Guenee, 1868)

Synonyms
- Spaelotis caerula Guenée, 1868; Physetica hudsoni Howes, 1906

= Physetica caerulea =

Species of moth

Physetica caerulea is a species of moth of the family Noctuidae. It is endemic to New Zealand and can be found from the centre of the North Island south, including the South and Stewart Islands. The adult moths are variable in appearance but can be distinguished by the bluish tinge to the forewings as well as the underside buff colour. However this species does have several forms including a very dark bluish black form, a brownish form and a green-brown form. It lives in open habitats and can be found in tussock grasslands and dunes and can normally be found from altitudes of sea level up to 900 m. Adults of this species are on the wing from August to April. As at 2017, the life history of is unknown as are the host species of its larvae. However it has been hypothesised that the larval host species is a tomentose plant.

== Taxonomy ==
This species was first described by Achille Guenée in 1868 and originally named Spaelotis caerulea. In 1887 Edward Meyrick placed this species in the Physetica genus. In 1906 George Howes, thinking he was describing a new species, named it Physetica hudsoni. This latter name was synonymised by George Hudson in 1928 into Physetica caerulea. In 1988 J. S. Dugdale confirmed this placement. In 2017 Robert Hoare undertook a review of New Zealand Noctuinae and also agreed with the placement of this species in the genus Physetica. The male holotype specimen is held in the Natural History Museum, London.

== Description ==
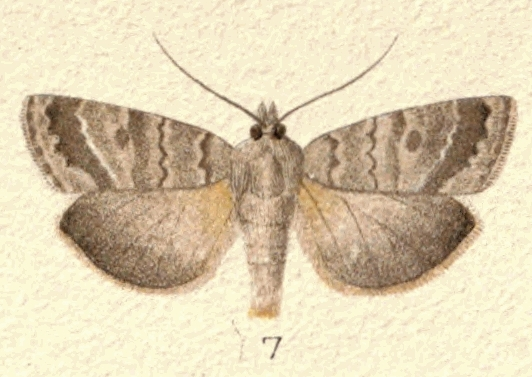
P. caerulea illustrated by George Hudson

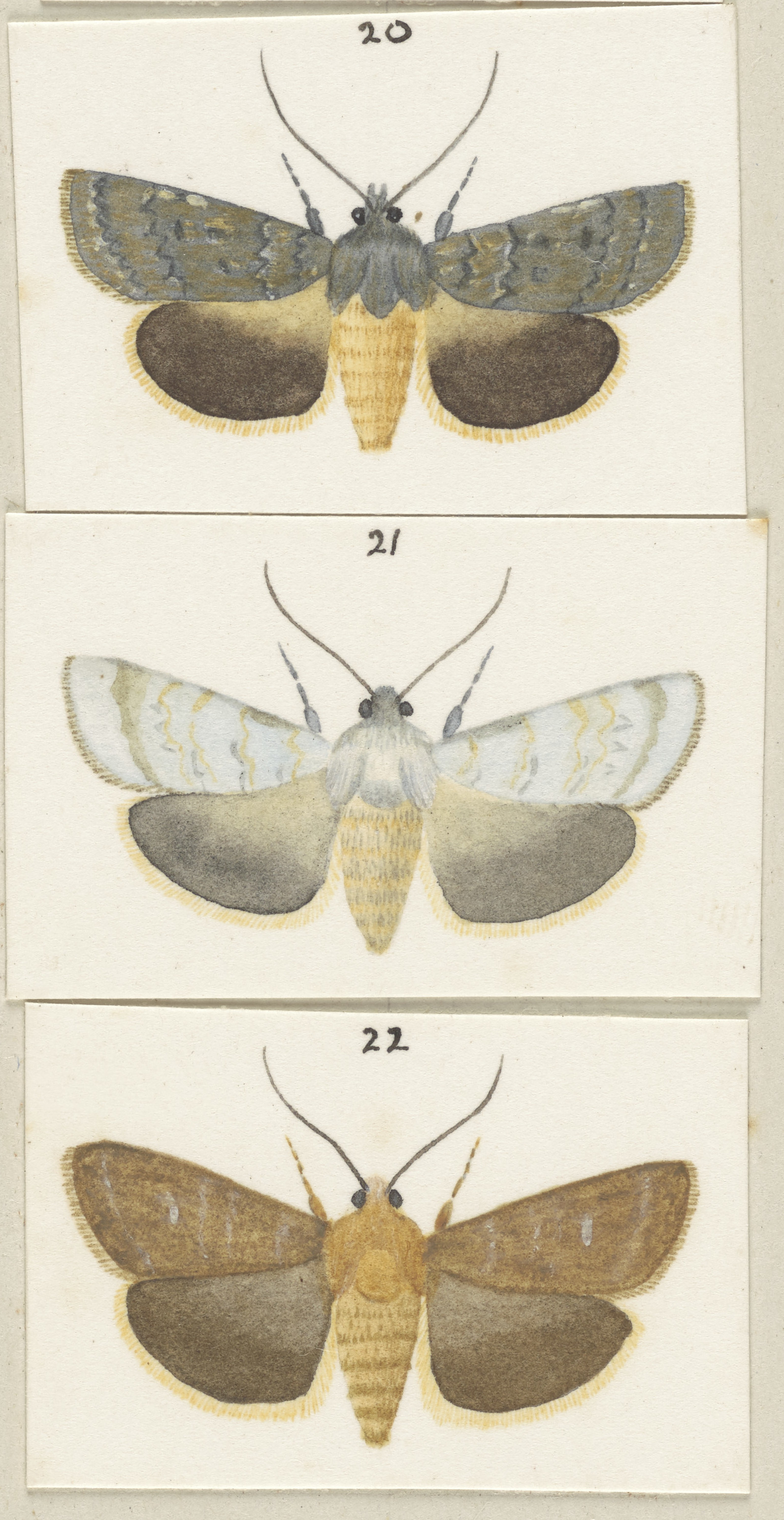
P. caerulea illustrated by George Hudson showing the variability of the species.

Hudson described this species as follows:

The expansion of the wings is 1 1/2 inches. The fore-wings are rich, glossy reddish-brown with several scattered whitish scales; there is a distinct yellow mark on the costa at about one-fourth, forming the beginning of a broken transverse line; the orbicular is small, round, and yellowish; the reniform is small, crescentic and yellowish, the space between the orbicular and the reniform is very dark blackish-brown; beyond the reniform there is a conspicuous white mark on the costa forming the beginning of a second broken transverse line; a third shaded line is situated near the termen. The hind-wings are pale brown with a dark spot in the middle, very conspicuous on the under surface.

The wingspan of the adult male is between 32.5 and 41 mm and for the female the wingspan is between 33.5 and 45 mm. The adults of this species are variable in appearance but can be distinguished by the bluish tinge to the forewings as well as the underside buff colour. However this species does have several forms including a very dark bluish black form, a brownish form and a green-brown form.

== Distribution ==
This species is endemic to New Zealand. This species can be found from the centre of the North Island south, including the South and Stewart Islands.

== Habitat ==
This species lives in open habitats and can be found in tussock grasslands and dunes. It can normally be found from altitudes of sea level up to 900 m, however there is one record of it being collected at 1385 m.

== Behaviour ==
Adults of this species are on the wing from August to April.

== Life history and host species ==
The life history of this species is unknown as are the host species of its larvae. However it has been hypothesised that the larval host species is a tomentose plant.
