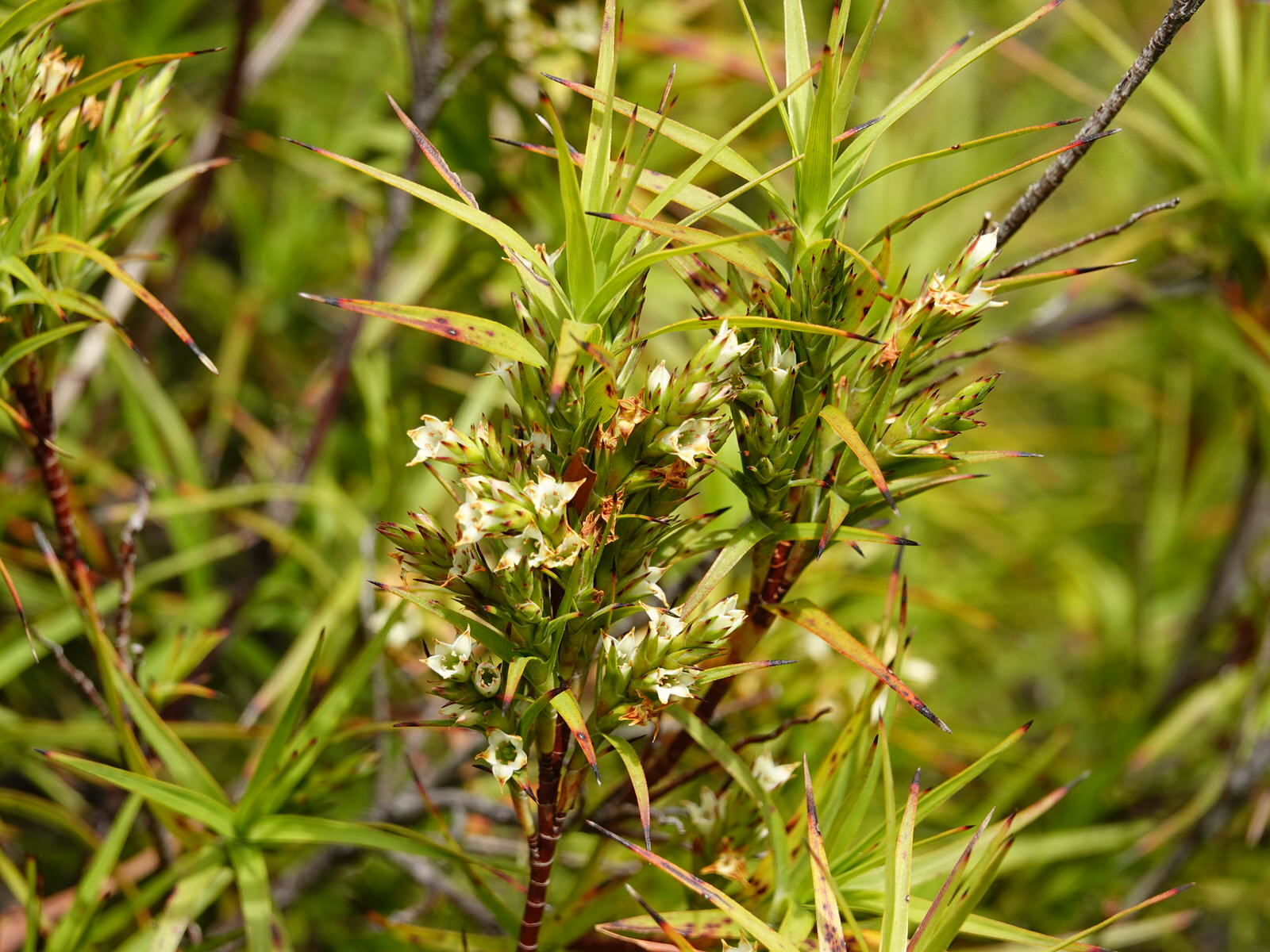

Scientific classification
- Kingdom: Plantae
- Clade: Tracheophytes
- Clade: Angiosperms
- Clade: Eudicots
- Clade: Asterids
- Order: Ericales
- Family: Ericaceae
- Genus: Dracophyllum
- Species: D. sinclairii

Binomial name
- Dracophyllum sinclairii Cheeseman

Synonyms
- Dracophyllum squarrosum Hook. f. Dracophyllum adamsii Petrie Dracophyllum viride W.R.B. Oliv.

= Dracophyllum sinclairii =

Species of flowering plant

Dracophyllum sinclairii is a species of plant in the family Ericaceae that is endemic to New Zealand, occurring in the northern half of the North Island. It grows in a variety of habitats, and is especially common in gumland scrub, as is Dracophyllum lessonianum. Both D. sinclairii and D. lessonianum have been called gumland grass tree.
