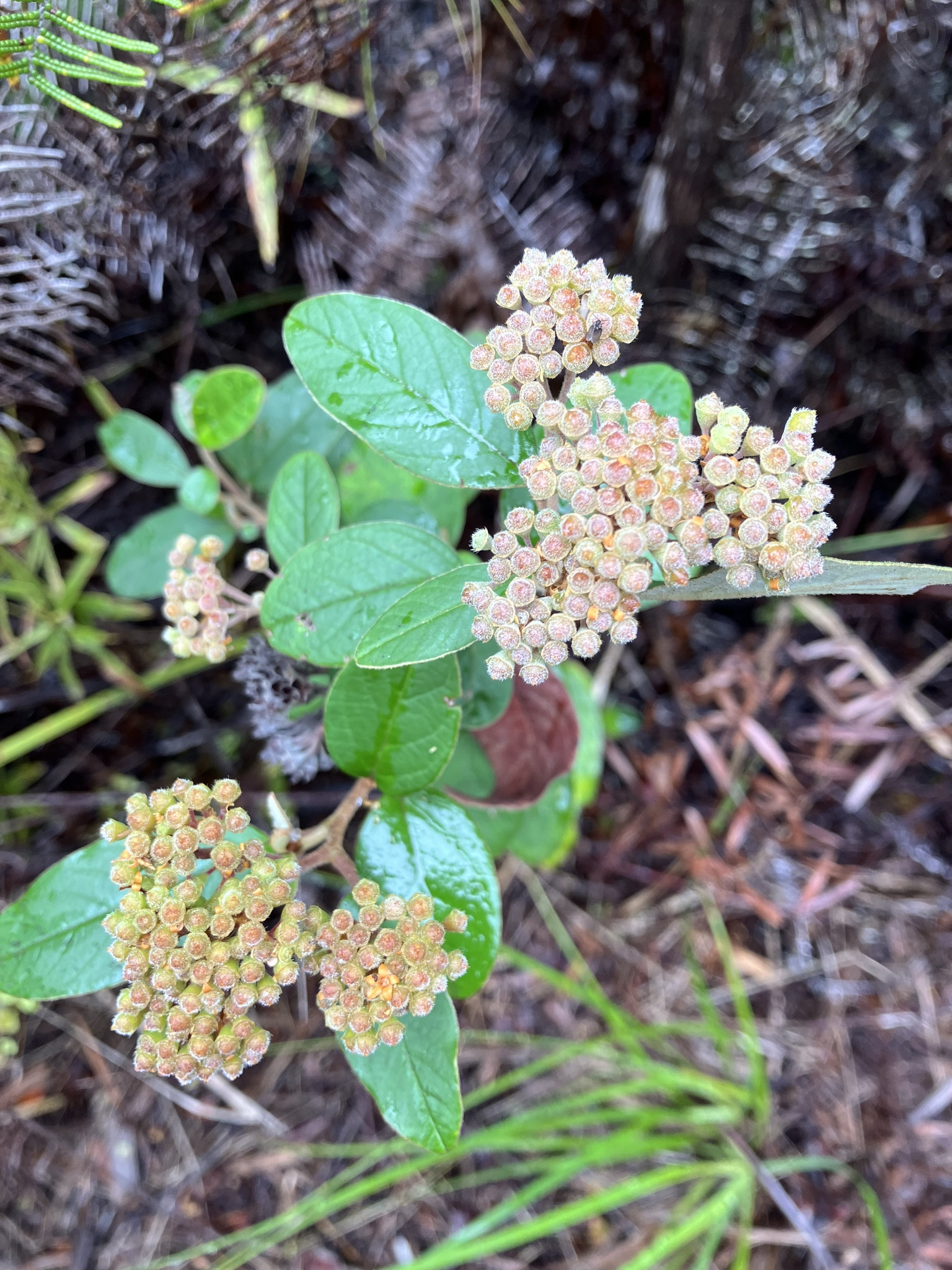

Scientific classification
- Kingdom: Plantae
- Clade: Tracheophytes
- Clade: Angiosperms
- Clade: Eudicots
- Clade: Rosids
- Order: Rosales
- Family: Rhamnaceae
- Genus: Pomaderris
- Species: P. kumeraho

Binomial name
- Pomaderris kumeraho A.Cunn. ex Fenzl

= Pomaderris kumeraho =

Kūmarahou

Species of flowering plant

Pomaderris kumeraho, or kūmarahou, also known as gumdigger's soap and golden tainui, is a plant endemic to the North Island of New Zealand. The name kūmarahou originates from Māori.

== Taxonomy and name ==
The species was first described by Allan Cunningham in 1839, based on material he had collected from the banks of the Kerikeri River in 1826. The first mention of the taxon was in the 1837 work Enumeratio plantarum quas in Novae Hollandiae ora austro-occidentali ad fluvium Cygnorum et in sinu Regis Georgii collegit Carolus Liber Baro de Hügel, in which Eduard Fenzl briefly mentioned the plant, but considered it to be a synonym of Pomaderris elliptica.

The name kūmarahou is a Māori language term which combines kūmara (sweet potatoes) and hou (new), likely as a reference to the flowers being a seasonal indication that kūmara should be planted. The specific epithet kumeraho is a Latinised form of the word kūmarahou. Other common names for the plant include gum-digger's soap and golden tainui.

The majority of the Pomaderris genus is found in Australia.

== Description ==
Kūmarahou is a shrub that typically grows to 2.5 m (8 ft 2 in) in height, but may grow as tall as 4 m (13 ft) in height. The plant has fuzzy twigs and wrinkled leaves, with distinct veins on the underside. The leaves measure approximately 6 cm (2.4 in) in length and 3 cm (1.2 in) in width.

Kūmarahou has dense, round clusters of small pale yellow flowers. The flowers appear for a brief three week window, between September and October in the Southern Hemisphere spring.

== Range and habitat ==
Pomaderris kumeraho is endemic to New Zealand, found in the north the North Island, as far south at the Kawhia Harbour and the northern Bay of Plenty. The plant grows in coastal and lowland areas, typically found near roadsides or in regenerating bush. As it is able to grow in barren areas, it grows in gumlands and became associated with kauri gum diggers' fields in the north of New Zealand.

== History ==
Kūmarahou has many uses in traditional Māori medicine, although there is little scientific confirmation of its benefits. Infusions of the leaves have been said to relieve various respiratory ailments and skin disorders. Yellow kūmarahou blossoms were also a traditional seasonal sign, indicating when kūmara (sweet potatoes) should be planted, and that toheroa should stop being harvested, so that the animals can replenish over the summer.

The name "gumdigger's soap" was given owing to the lather created when the flowers were rubbed with water, something that was adopted by 19th century kauri gum diggers. The plant was also used as a flavouring agent for alcohol by early European settlers to New Zealand.

Kūmarahou is used as an ingredient in many modern herbal remedies in New Zealand, including as a tea, facial cleansers and makeup removers.

== Gallery ==
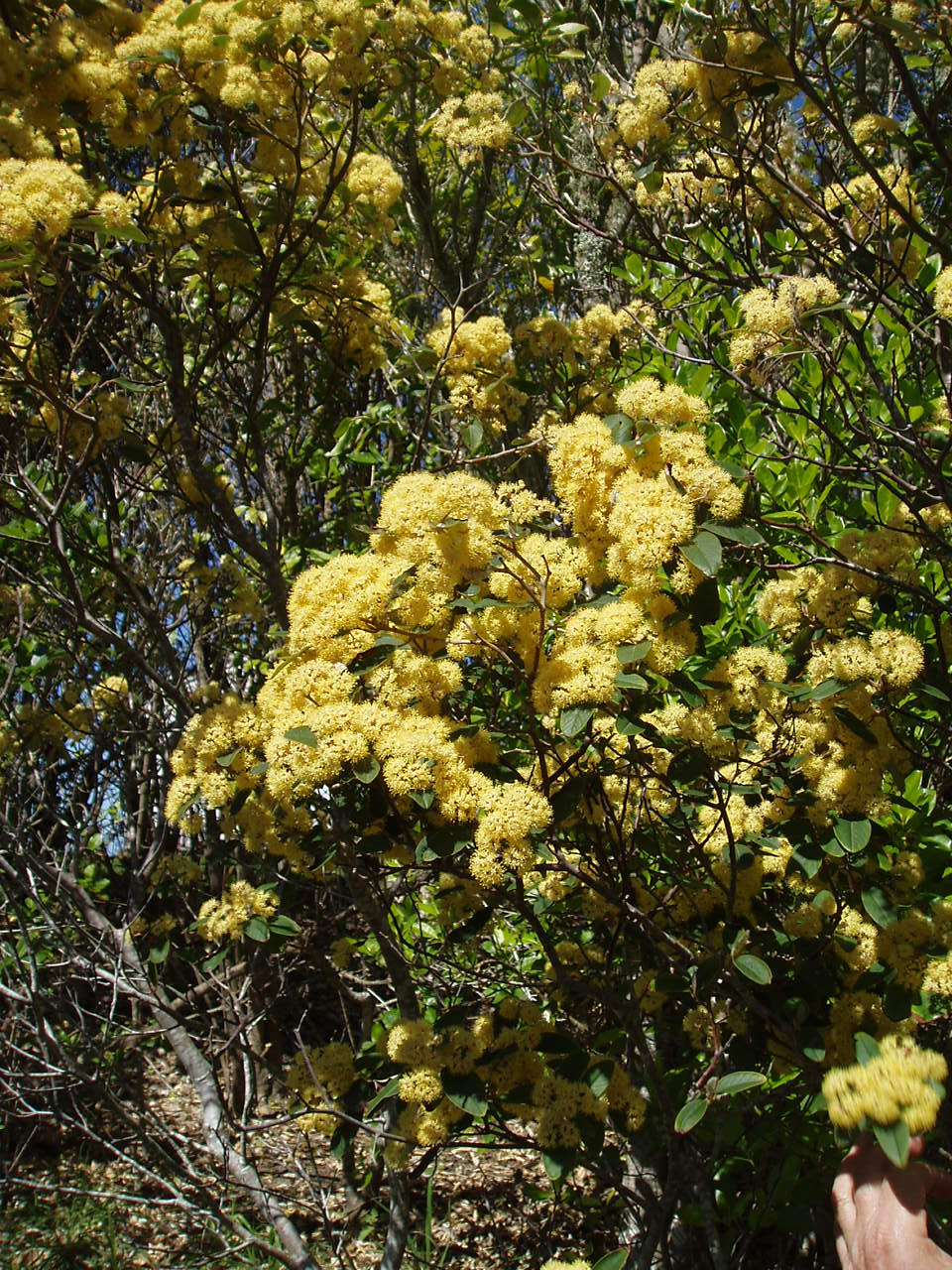
A larger Pomaderris kumaraho

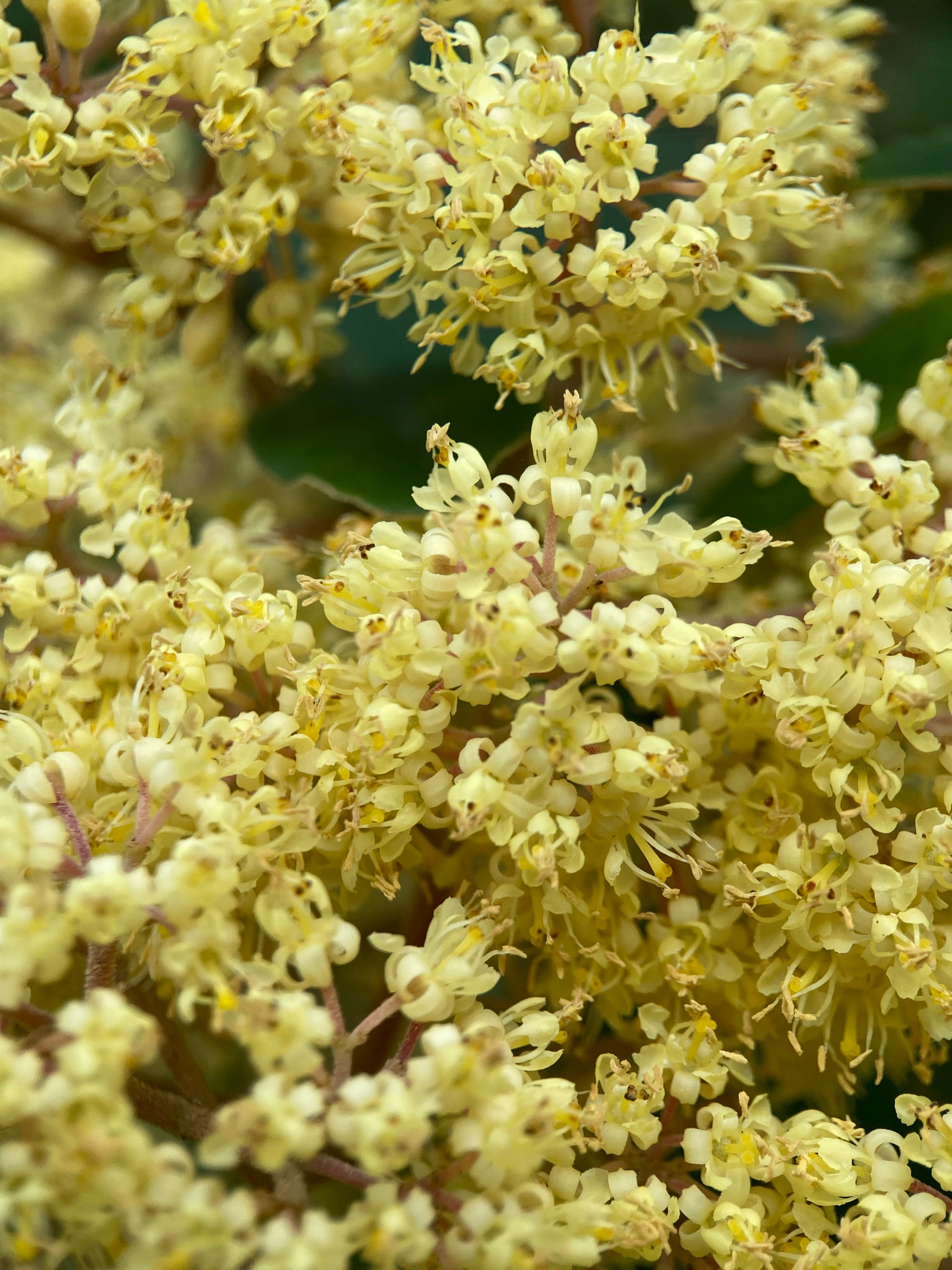
Close up of flowers

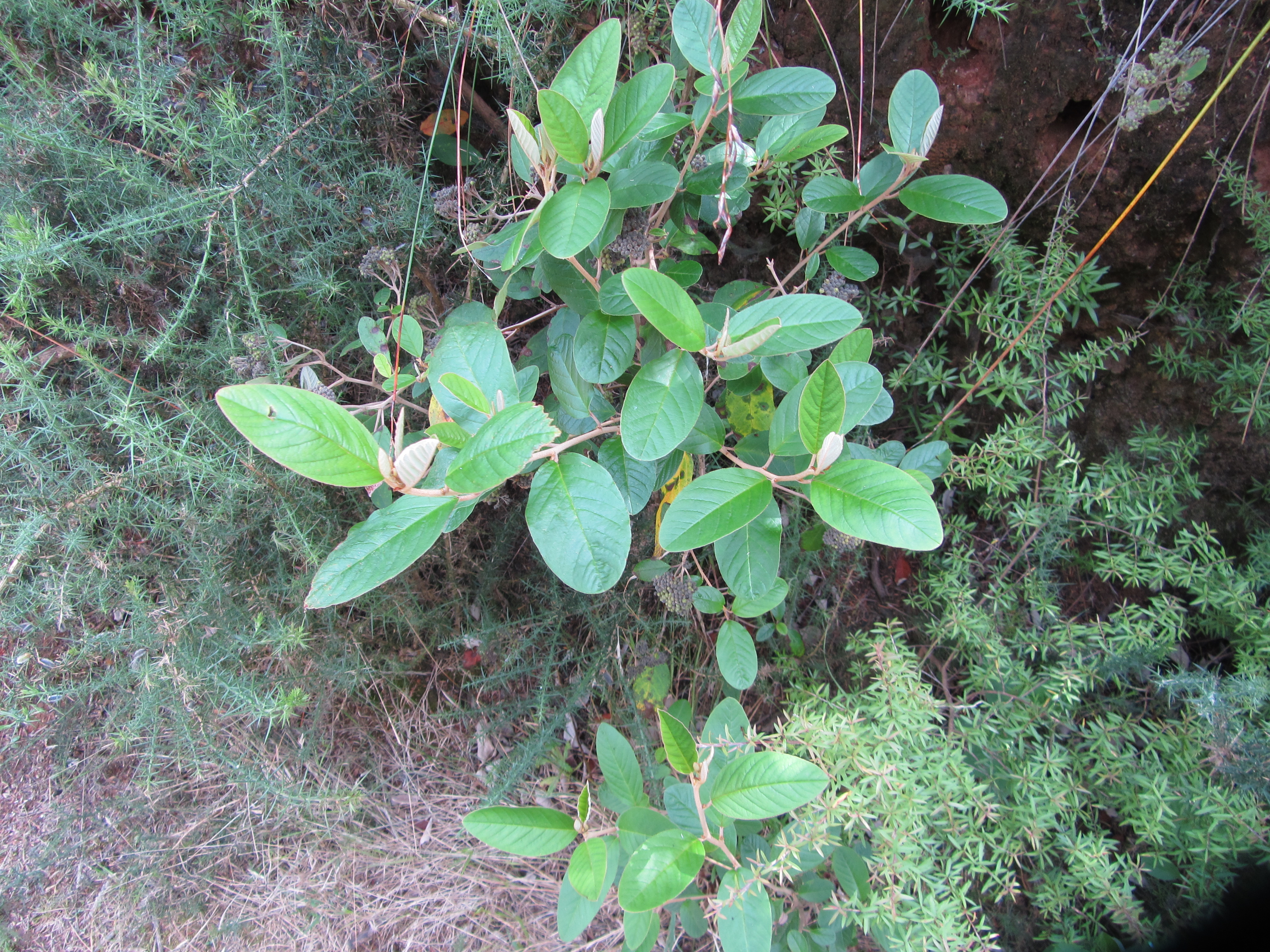
Typical view of plant when not flowering

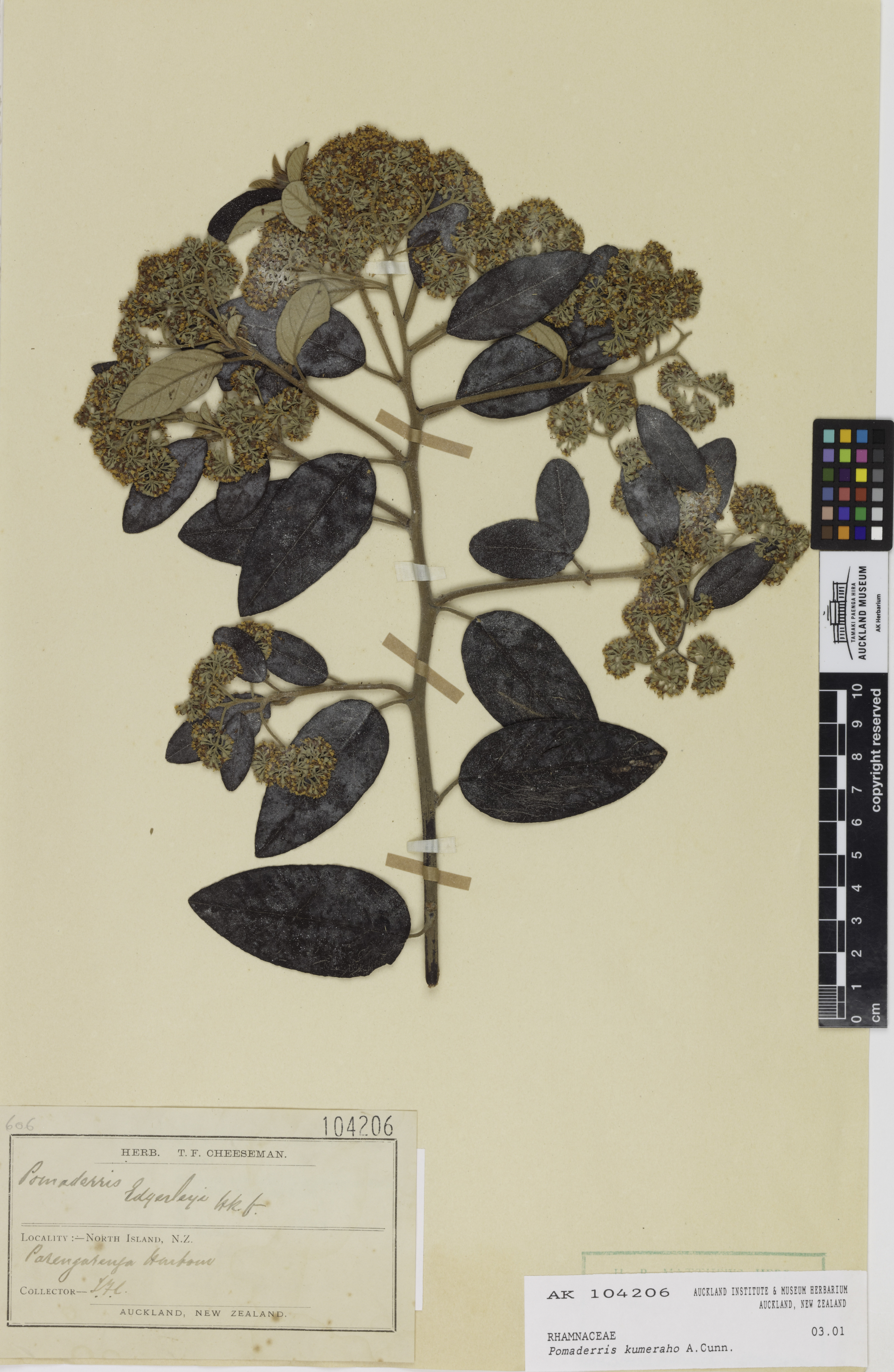
Herbarium specimen
