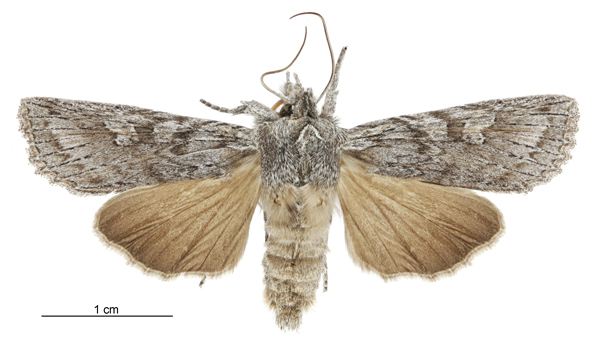
- Female
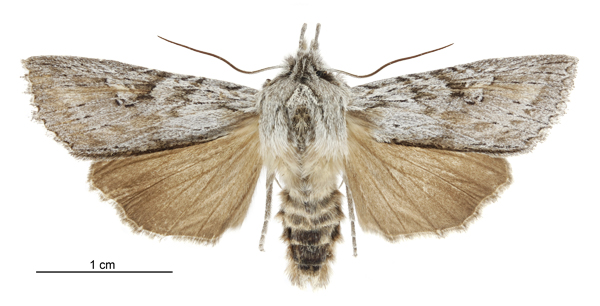
- Male

Scientific classification
- Kingdom: Animalia
- Phylum: Arthropoda
- Class: Insecta
- Order: Lepidoptera
- Superfamily: Noctuoidea
- Family: Noctuidae
- Genus: Physetica
- Species: P. phricias

Binomial name
- Physetica phricias (Meyrick, 1888)

Synonyms
- Mamestra phricias Meyrick, 1888; Melanchra phricias (Meyrick, 1888); Morrisonia phricias (Meyrick, 1888); Cucullia cellulata Warren, 1911; Graphania phricias (Meyrick, 1888)

= Physetica phricias =

Species of moth endemic to New Zealand

Physetica phricias is a moth of the family Noctuidae. It is endemic to New Zealand. It is wide spread in the South Island and inhabits shrubland. The host of the larvae of this species is matagouri. The adult moths are on the wing from September to May and July, and are attracted both to light and sugar traps.They are a faster-flying species and remain active even during windy conditions. P. phricias can be confused with some forms of P. sequens. However P. phricias can be distinguished as it has a less marbled appearance to its forewing.

== Taxonomy ==
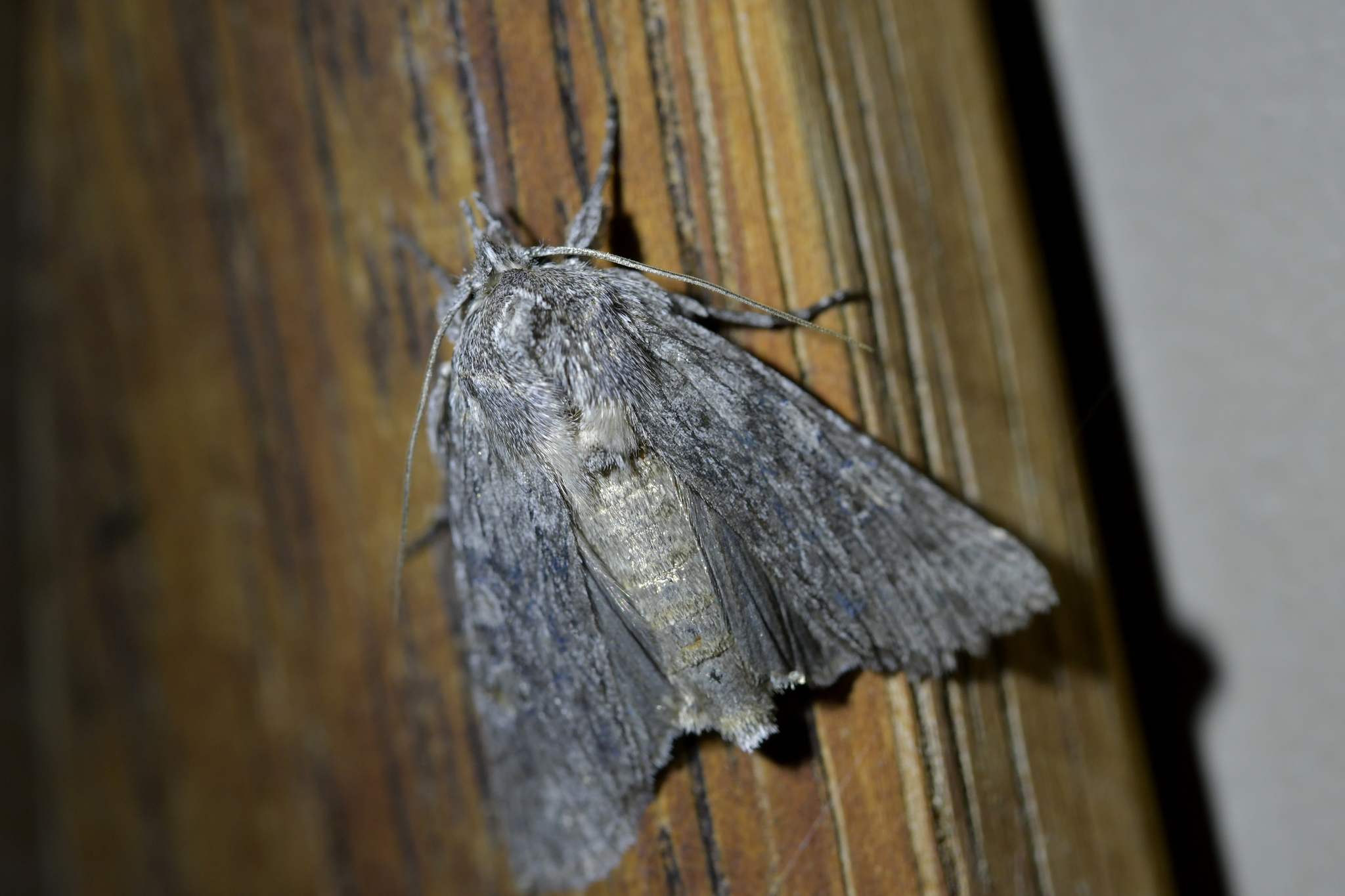
Observation of Physetica phricias

This species was first named by Edward Meyrick as Mamestra phricias in 1888. George Hudson described and illustrated this species both in his 1898 book New Zealand moths and butterflies (Macro-lepidoptera) and in his 1928 book The butterflies and moths of New Zealand using the name Melanchra phricias. In 1905 George Hampston placed this species within the genus Morrisonia. In 1911 William Warren believing he was describing a new species named it Cucullia cellulata. In 1988 J. S. Dugdale discussed the species under the name Graphania phricias.

In 2017 Robert J. B. Hoare undertook a revision of New Zealand Noctuinae and placed this species within the Physetica genus. As such this species is currently known as Physetica phricias. At the same time Hoare synonymised Cucullia cellulata into that name.

The lectotype specimen is held at the Natural History Museum, London. The lectotype was collected by R. W. Fereday in Christchurch.

== Description ==
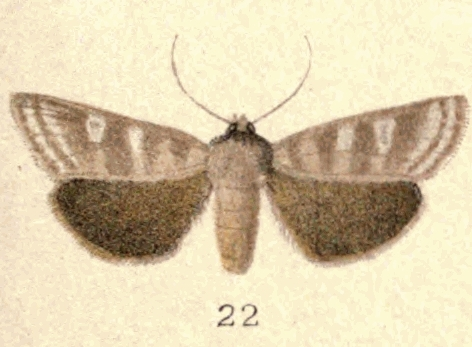
Illustration of Physetica phricias by George Hudson.

The larvae of this species are up to 33mm in length and are grey coloured with the dorsal having a pink shade. The larvae have a black and white sub-dorsal line as well as a broad whiteish lateral band.

Hudson described the adult moth of the species as follows:

The expansion of the wings is about 1 1/2 inches. The fore-wings are pale silvery-grey; there are several obscure blackish marks near the base, two dark, shaded, transverse bands, one just before the orbicular, and one between the orbicular and the reniform; the orbicular is round, nearly white, with a faint greyish ring in the middle; the reniform is large, oblong, margined first with white and then with black; there is a series of black crescentic marks near the termen, and another smaller series on the termen; the cilia are dark grey. The hind-wings are dull brownish-grey, the cilia are grey tipped with white. The terminal joint of the palpi is elongated.

Physetica phricias can be confused with some forms of P. sequens. However P. phricias can be distinguished as it has a less marbled appearance to its forewing.

== Distribution ==
This species endemic to New Zealand. It is widespread in the South Island. Hoare pointed out that although both Hudson and E. G. White stated that specimens had been collected in the central and southern North island, he could not find specimens in any collection to confirm this.

== Behaviour and biology ==
The adult moths are on the wing from September to May with some specimens also collected in July. Adult moths are attracted to sugar and light. They have been trapped using Robinson light traps. They are a faster-flying species and remain active even during windy conditions.

== Habitat and host species ==
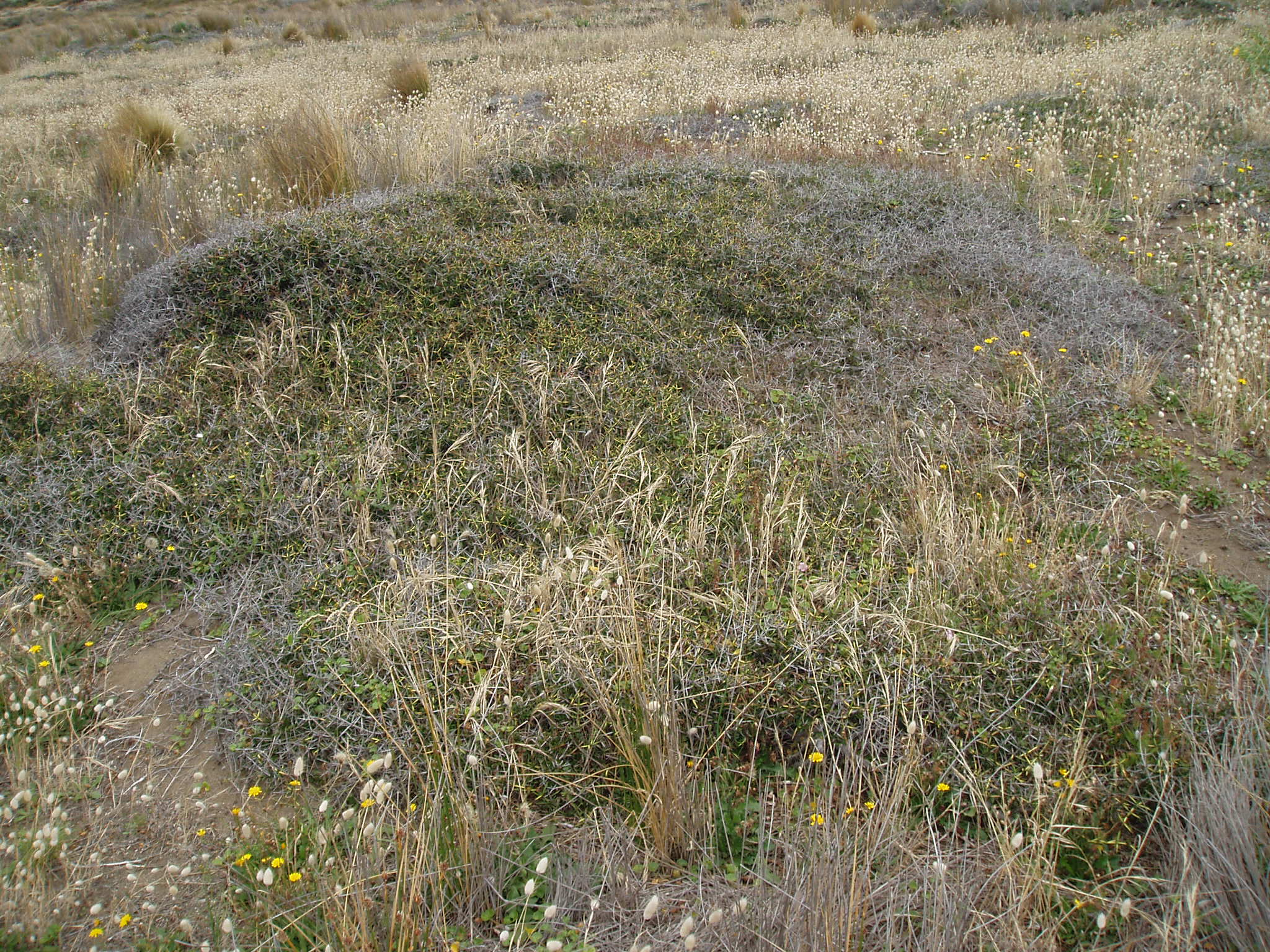
Discaria toumatou, host species of P. phricias.

The preferred habitat of P. phricias is scrubland. The host of the larvae of this species is Discaria toumatou.

== Conservation status ==
Physetica phricias is currently not regarded as threatened.
