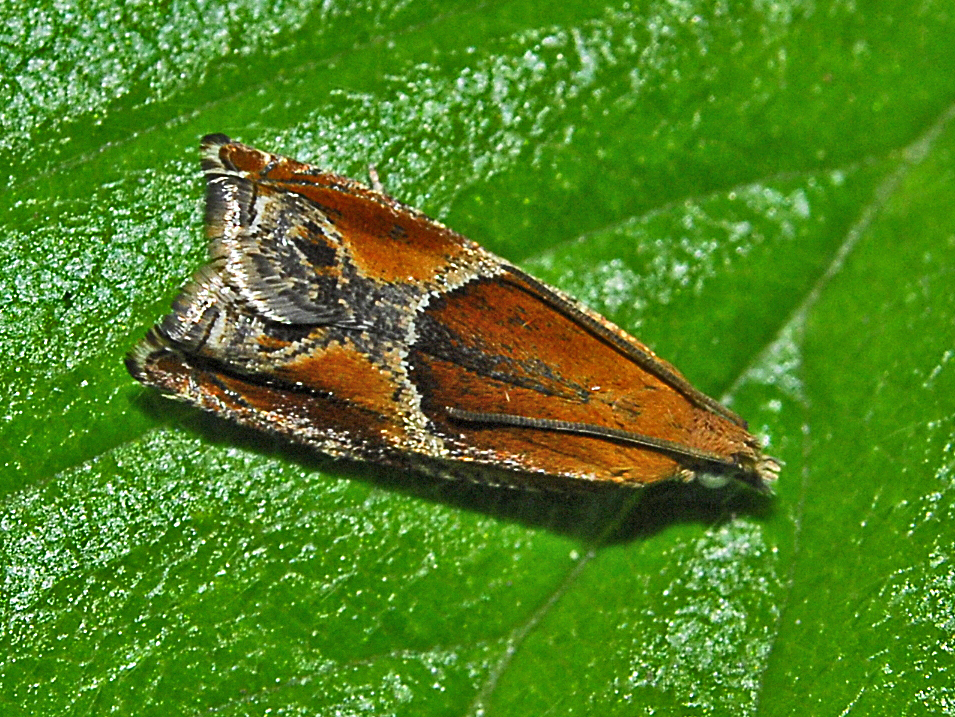
- Ancylis obtusana. Upperside
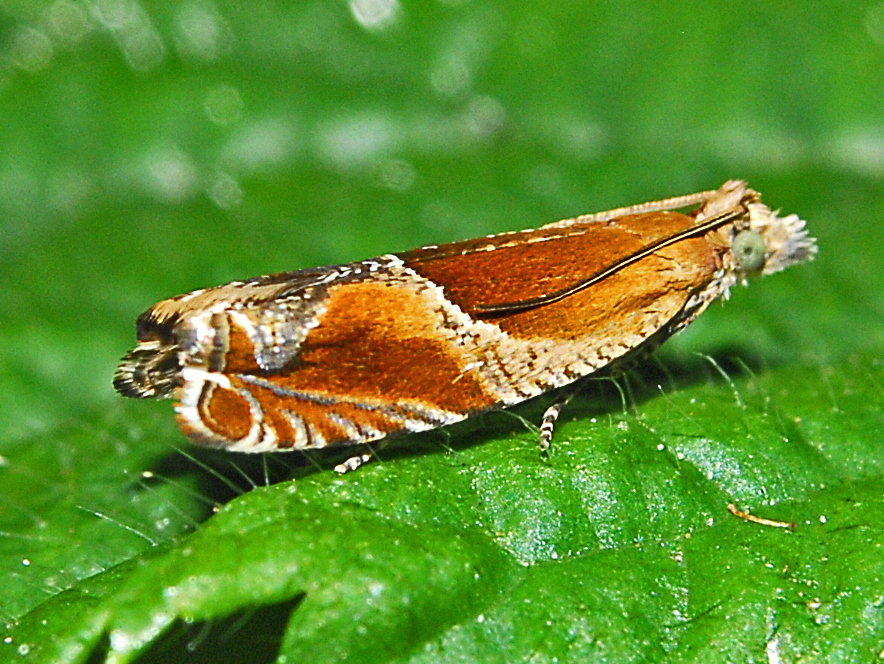
- Side view

Scientific classification
- Kingdom: Animalia
- Phylum: Arthropoda
- Clade: Pancrustacea
- Class: Insecta
- Order: Lepidoptera
- Family: Tortricidae
- Genus: Ancylis
- Species: A. obtusana

Binomial name
- Ancylis obtusana (Haworth, 1811)

Synonyms
- Tortrix obtusana Haworth, 1811; Anchylopera consobrinana Curtis, 1831; Grapholitha distortana Guenee, 1845; Tortrix (Steganoptycha) segmentana Herrich-Schaffer, 1851

= Ancylis obtusana =

Species of moth

Ancylis obtusana, the small buckthorn roller, is a moth of the family Tortricidae.

== Distribution and habitat ==
This species is present in most of Europe, in the eastern Palearctic realm, and in the Near East. These moths inhabit marginal areas of forests where host plants grow.

== Description ==
Ancylis obtusana has a wingspan of about 12 millimetres (0.47 in). The forewings are red brown, with a rounded reddish patch and the costa stringulated (finely streaked) with white and brown. The hind wings are brownish. Meyrick describes it - Forewings ferruginous, costa with dark fuscous and whitish strigidae; basal patch dark ferruginous-brown except towards costa, edge rounded, very oblique, reaching beyond middle of dorsum, followed by a grey-whitish stria broadly enlarged on costa; central fascia dark ferruginous-brown, with strong posterior median projection, not reaching dorsum; costal area beyond this dark ferruginous; ocellus small, broadly edged with leaden- metallic. Hind wings fuscous, darker terminally. Julius von Kennel provides a full description.

Similar species are Ancylis comptana and Ancylis mitterbacheriana.

== Biology ==
The adult moths fly from May to July. Larvae feed on alder buckthorn (Frangula alnus) and buckthorn (Rhamnus cathartica). They overwinter in leaves of these host plants that they spin together.

== Gallery ==
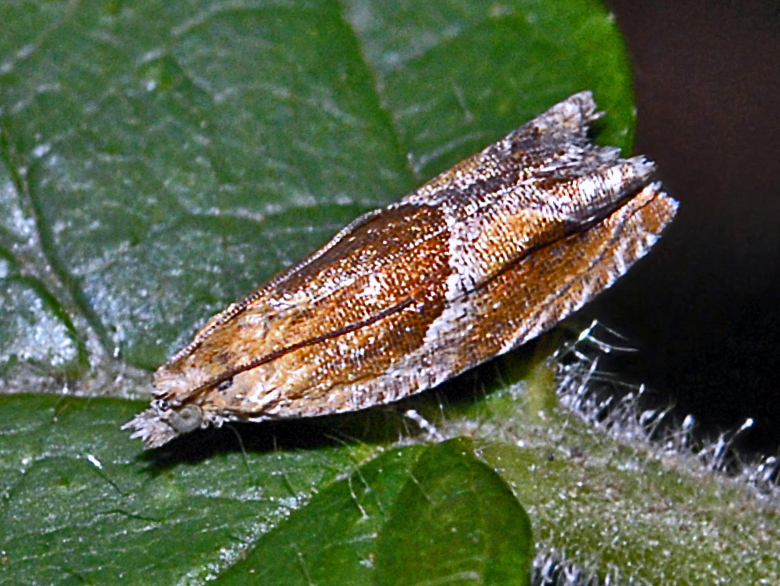
Ancylis obtusana

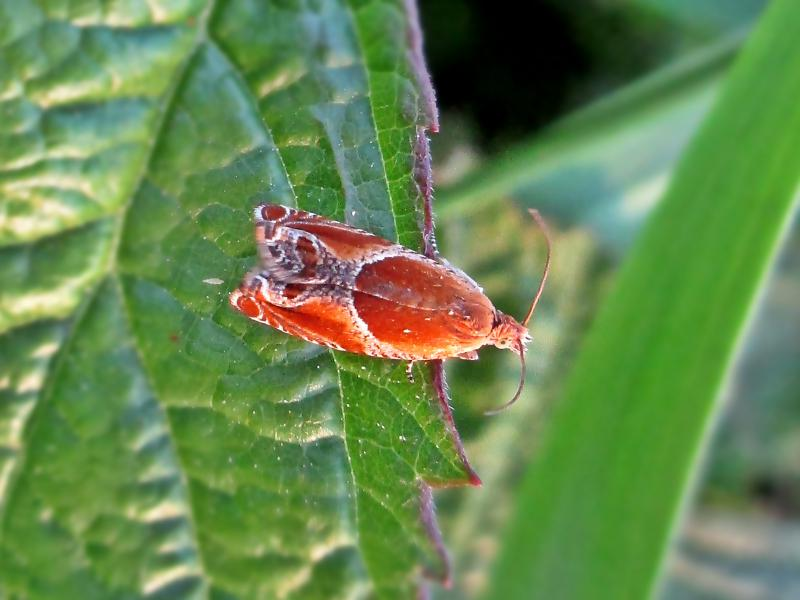
A. obtusana from Arnhem, the Netherlands

== Bibliography ==
- Erstbeschreibung: Haworth, A. H. (1803–1828): Lepidoptera Britannica; sistens digestionem novam insectorum lepidopterorum quæ in Magna Britannia reperiuntur, larvarum pabulo, temporeque pascendi; expansione alarum; mensibusque volandi; synonymis atque locis observationibusque variis: I-XXXVI, 1–609. Londini (R. Taylor).
- HEPPNER, J. B. (1982): Dates of selected Lepidoptera literature for the western hemisphere fauna.—Journal of the Lepidopterologists' Society 36 (2): 87–111.
