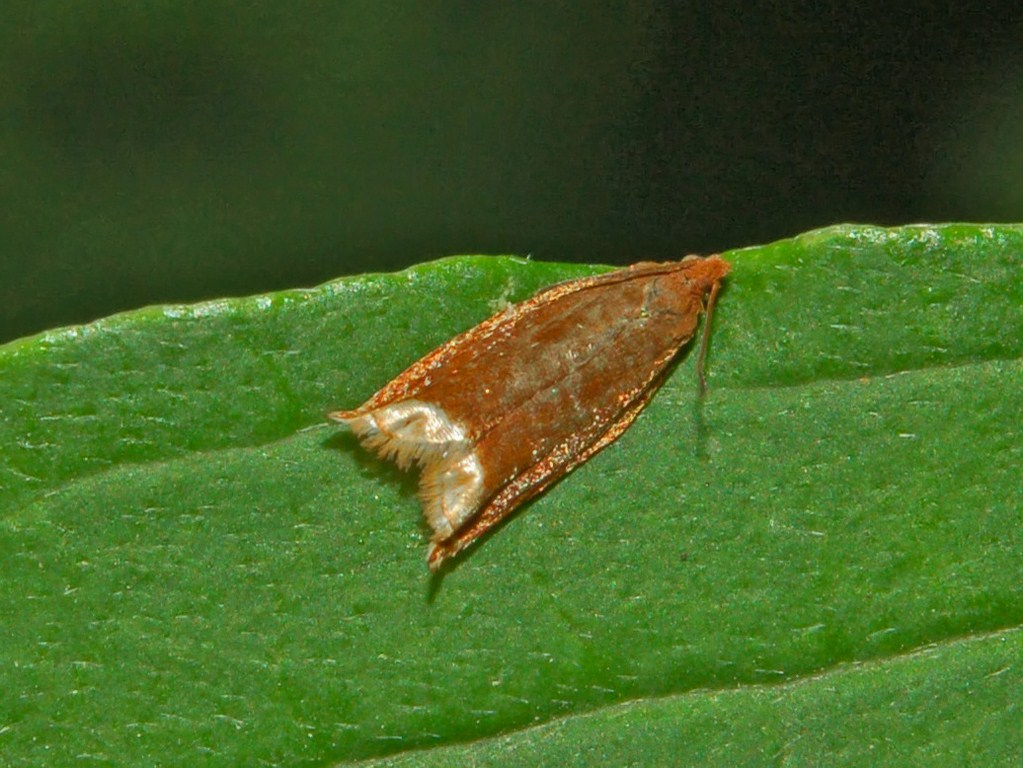

Scientific classification
- Kingdom: Animalia
- Phylum: Arthropoda
- Class: Insecta
- Order: Lepidoptera
- Family: Tortricidae
- Genus: Ancylis
- Species: A. selenana

Binomial name
- Ancylis selenana (Guenée, 1845)

= Ancylis selenana =

Species of moth

Ancylis selenana is a moth of the family Tortricidae. It is found from southern Sweden and Finland to France and Italy and to the Balkan Peninsula. Outside of Europe, it is found from Asia Minor to southern Siberia and Korea.

The wingspan is 10–15 mm. Adults are on wing from April to May and again in July and August in Germany and Poland. There are two generations per year in Germany and Poland. In southern Europe, there can be up to five generations yearly.

The larvae feed on Crataegus, Prunus cerasus vulgaris, Prunus avium, Prunus virginiana, Prunus spinosa, Prunus domestica, Prunus armeniaca, Malus and Pyrus. The larvae damage the leaves of the host plant.
