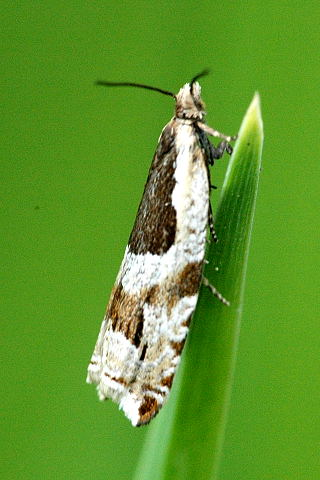

Scientific classification
- Kingdom: Animalia
- Phylum: Arthropoda
- Clade: Pancrustacea
- Class: Insecta
- Order: Lepidoptera
- Family: Tortricidae
- Genus: Ancylis
- Species: A. badiana

Binomial name
- Ancylis badiana (Denis & Schiffermüller, 1775)

= Ancylis badiana =

Species of moth

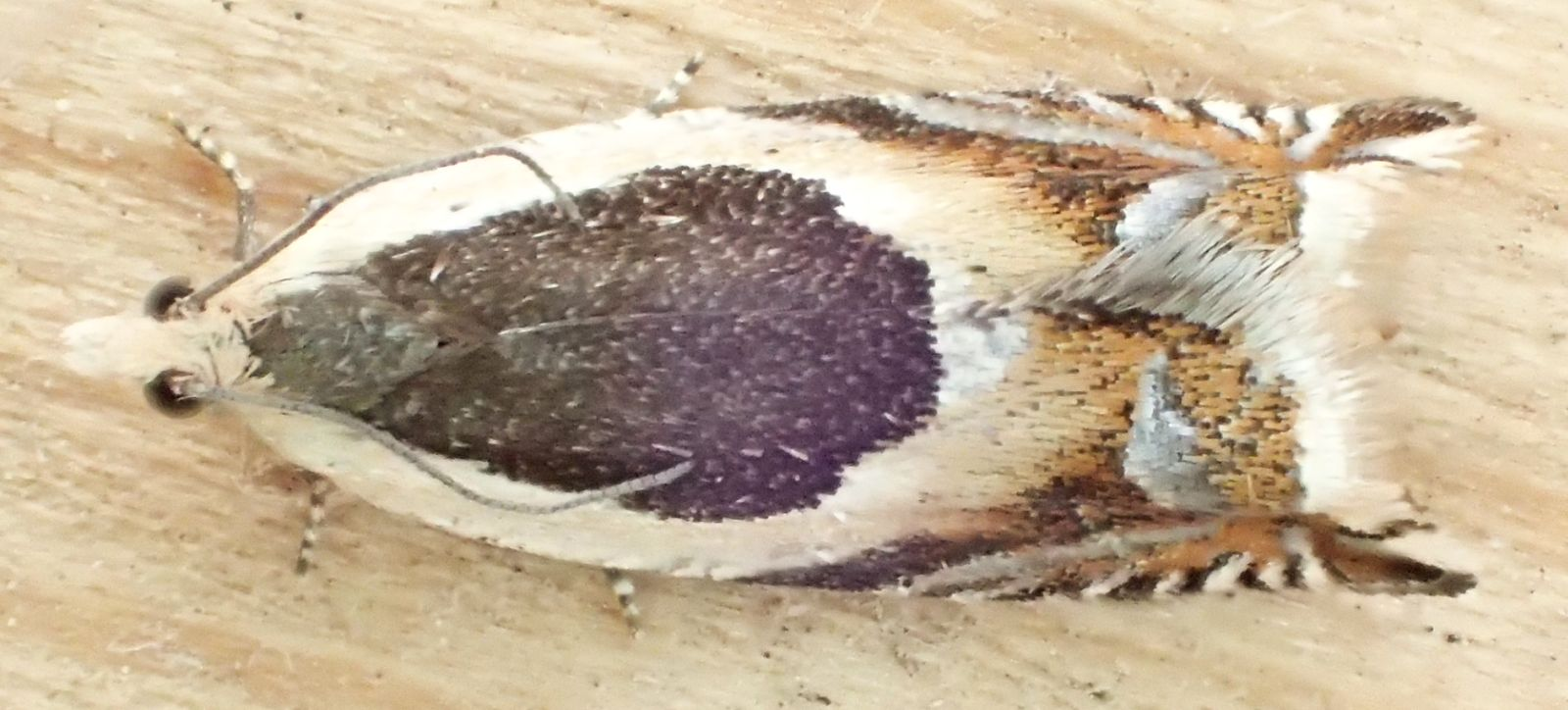

Ancylis badiana is a moth of the family Tortricidae. It is found in the Palearctic realm.

The wingspan is 12–16 mm.16–20 mm.

The moth flies from late April to June and again from July to September in two generations, although this might be dependent on the location.

The larvae feed on Trifolium, Vicia, Lathyrus and Lythrum salicaria.
