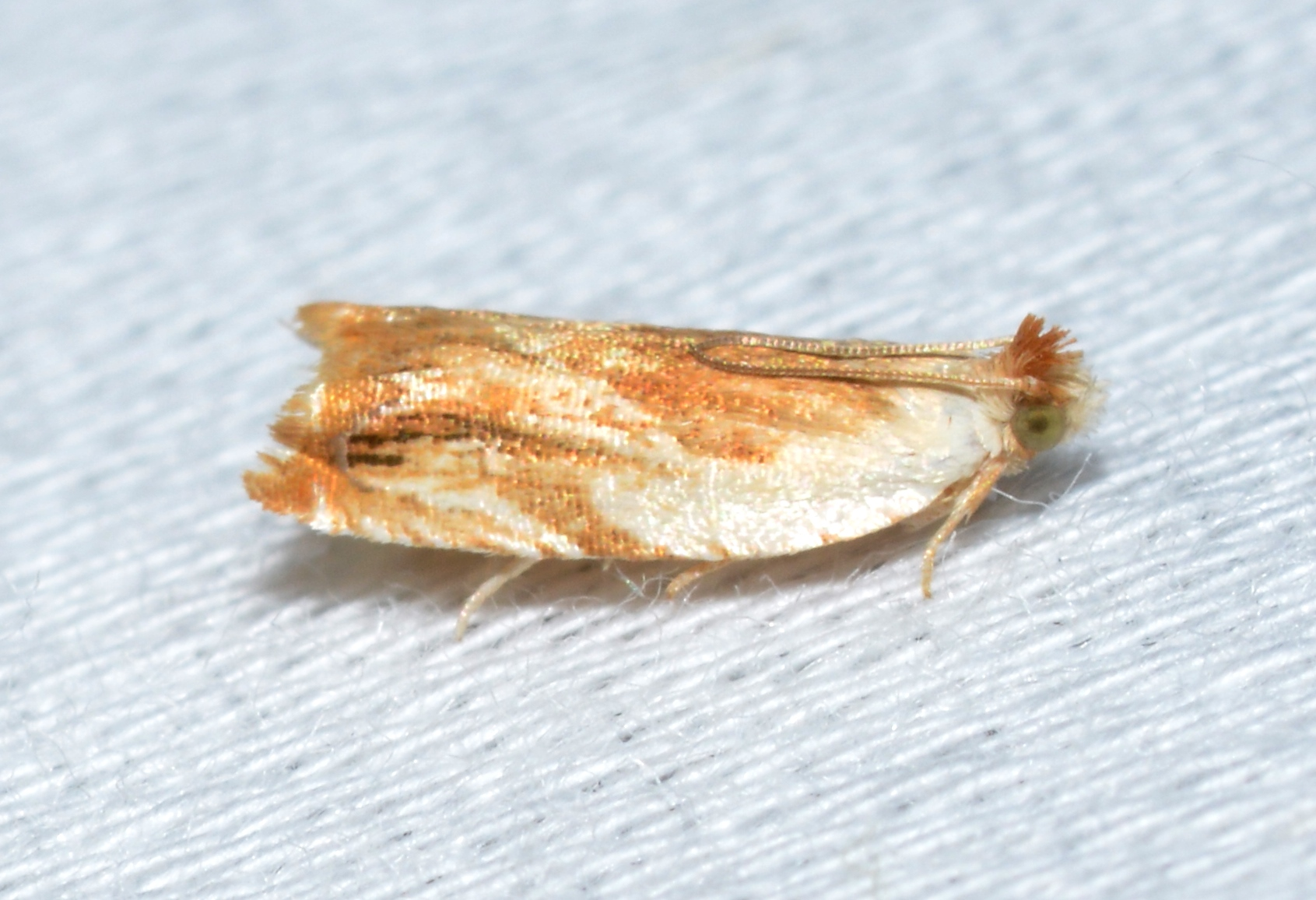

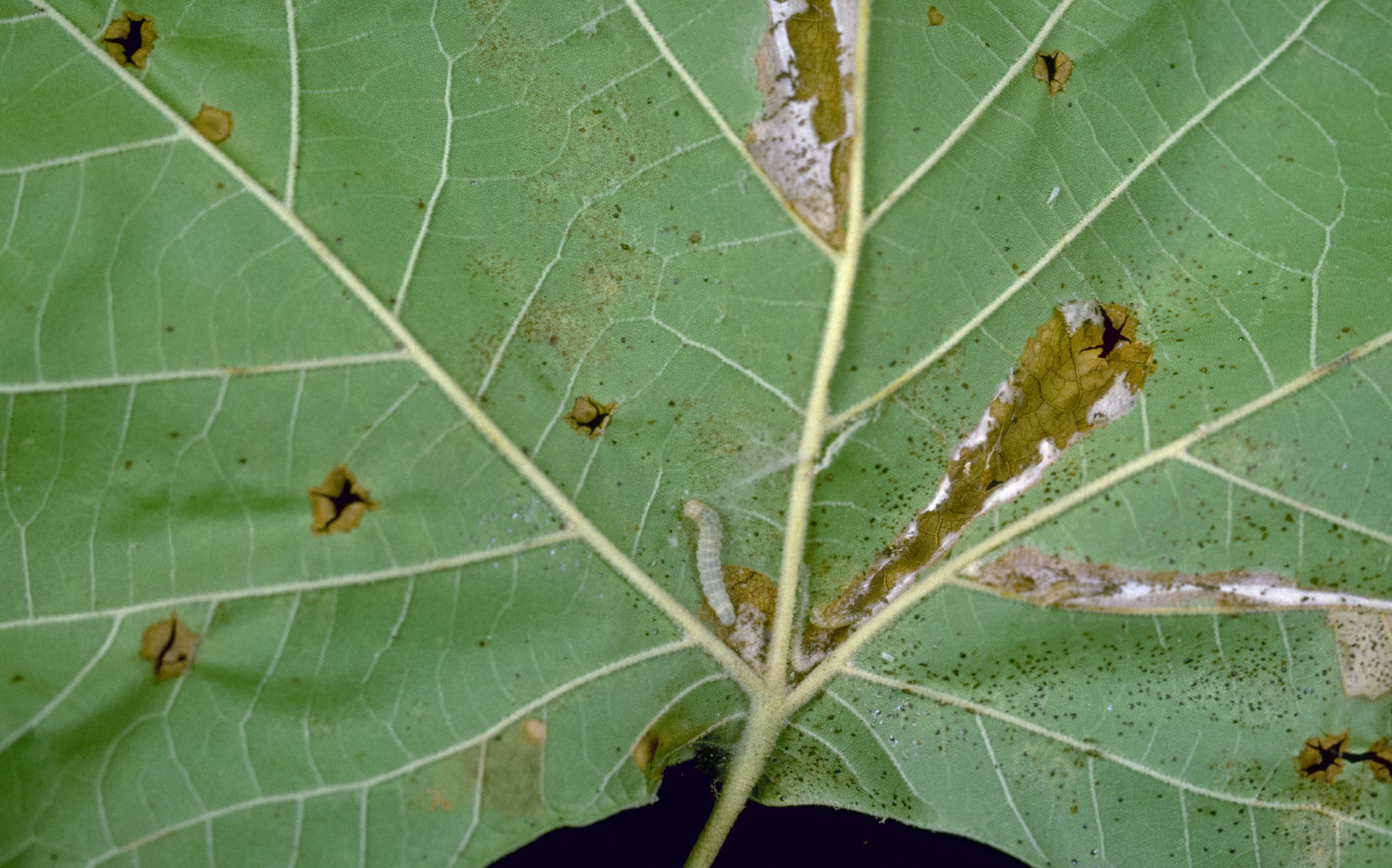
- feeding damage on sycamore

Scientific classification
- Kingdom: Animalia
- Phylum: Arthropoda
- Clade: Pancrustacea
- Class: Insecta
- Order: Lepidoptera
- Family: Tortricidae
- Genus: Ancylis
- Species: A. platanana

Binomial name
- Ancylis platanana (Clemens, 1860)

Synonyms
- Anchylopera platanana Clemens, 1860; Phoxopteris marcidana Zeller, 1875

= Ancylis platanana =

Species of moth

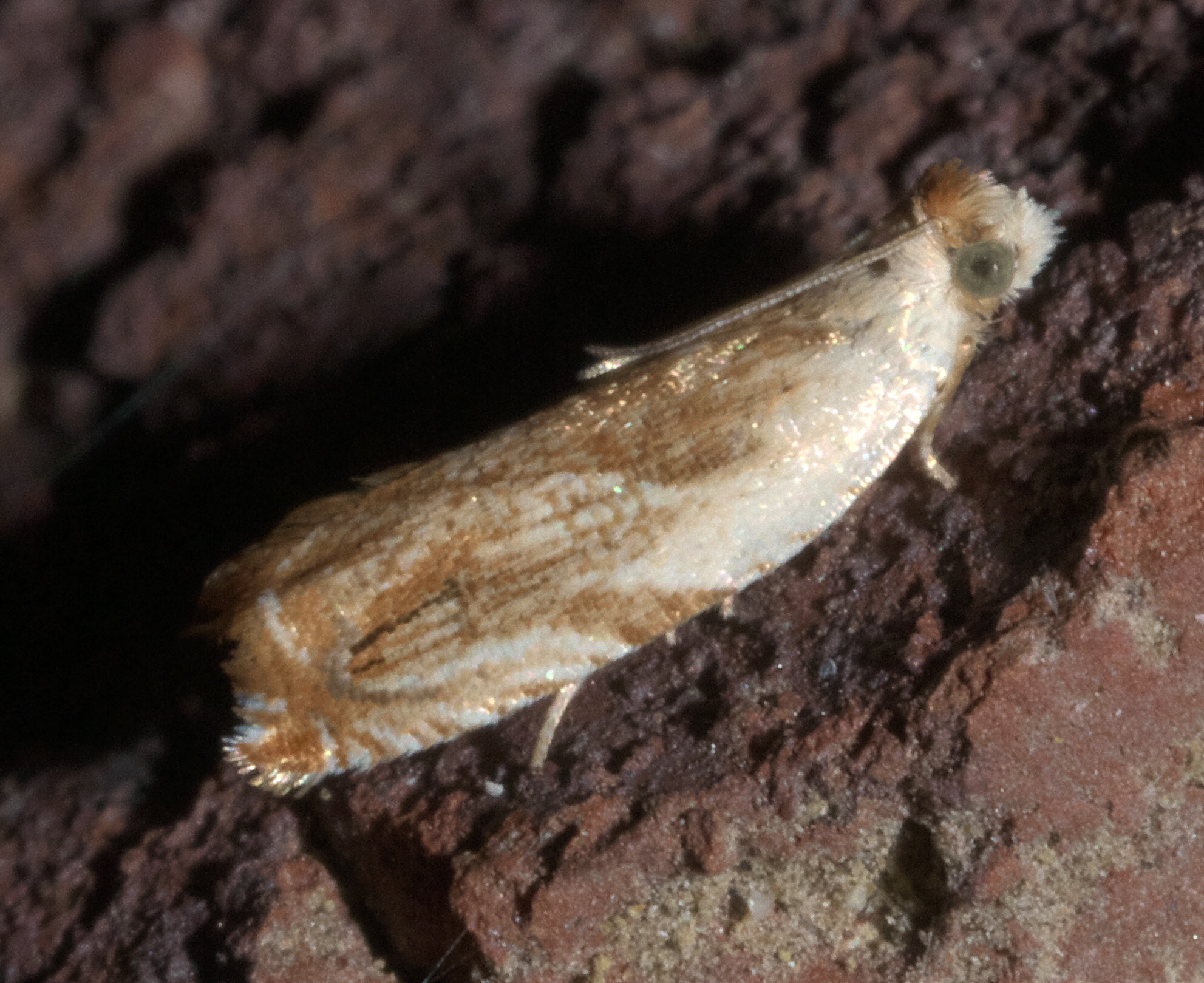
Ancylis platanana, size: 5.8 mm

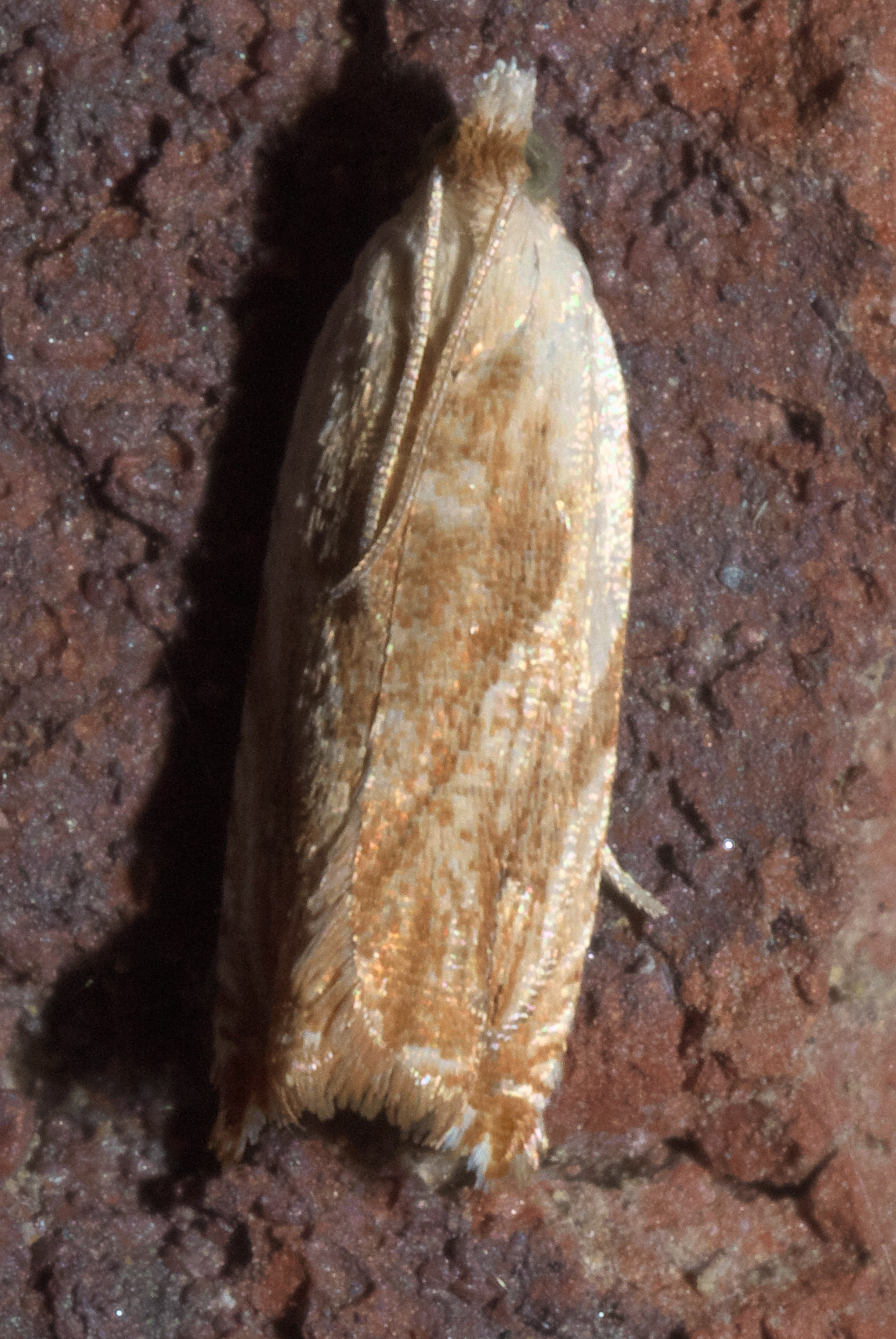
Ancylis platanana, size: 5.8 mm

Ancylis platanana is a species of moth of the family Tortricidae. It is found in the eastern United States, including Illinois, Maryland, North Carolina, Oklahoma, Pennsylvania and Texas.

The wingspan is 11–15 mm.
