= Ancylis gigas =

Scientific classification
- Kingdom: Animalia
- Phylum: Arthropoda
- Class: Insecta
- Order: Lepidoptera
- Family: Tortricidae
- Genus: Ancylis
- Species: A. gigas

Binomial name
- Ancylis gigas Razowski, 2009

Species of moth

Ancylis gigas is a moth of the family Tortricidae. It is found in Vietnam.

The wingspan is 22.5 mm.
