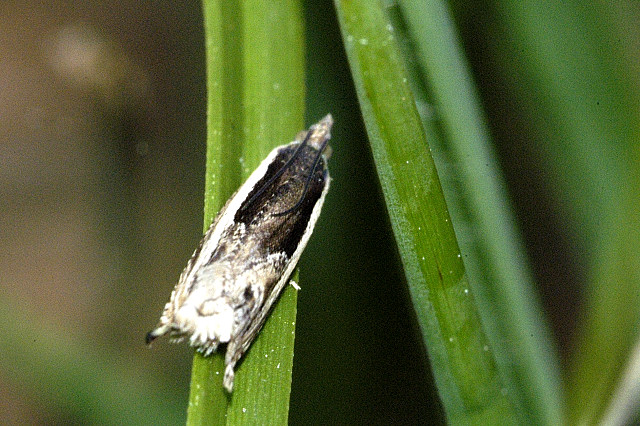

Scientific classification
- Kingdom: Animalia
- Phylum: Arthropoda
- Class: Insecta
- Order: Lepidoptera
- Family: Tortricidae
- Genus: Ancylis
- Species: A. apicella

Binomial name
- Ancylis apicella (Denis & Schiffermüller, 1775)

= Ancylis apicella =

Species of moth

Ancylis apicella is a moth of the family Tortricidae. It is found in the Palearctic realm, including much of Europe, China, Russian Far East, Mongolia, Korea, and Japan.

The wingspan is 12–17 mm. The larvae feed on Frangula alnus, Rhamnus cathartica, Rhamnus pumila, Ligustrum, and Prunus spinosa.
