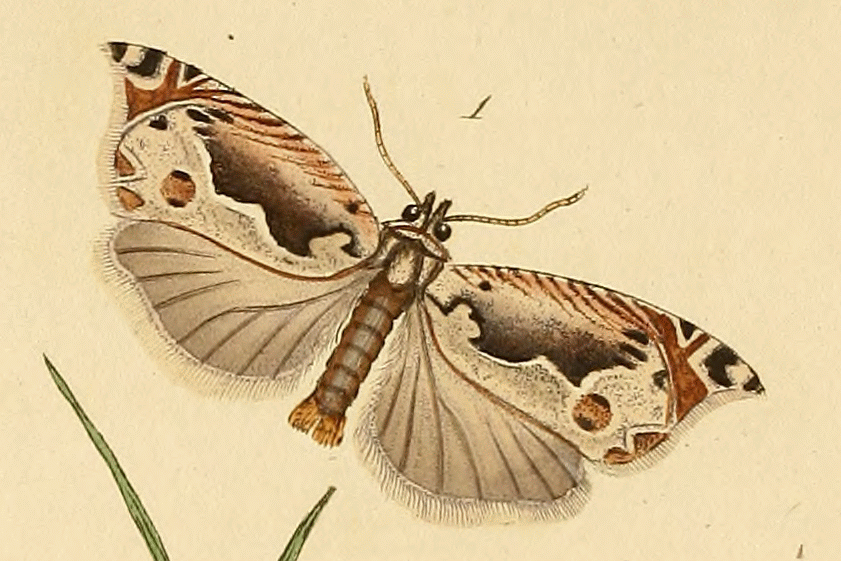

Scientific classification
- Kingdom: Animalia
- Phylum: Arthropoda
- Class: Insecta
- Order: Lepidoptera
- Family: Tortricidae
- Genus: Ancylis
- Species: A. geminana

Binomial name
- Ancylis geminana (Donovan, [1806])

Synonyms
- Phalaena geminana Donovan, [1806]; Anchylopera biarcuana Stephens, 1834; Phoxopterix crenana Duponchel, in Godart, 1835; Phoxopteris cuspidana Treitschke, 1830; Ancylis diminuatana Kearfott, 1905; Ancylis fluctigerana Herrich-Schaffer, 1848; Tortrix (Phoxopteryx) fluctigerana Herrich-Schaffer, 1851; Ancylis inornatana Herrich-Schaffer, 1848; Tortrix (Phoxopteryx) inornatana Herrich-Schaffer, 1851; Anchylopera subarcuana Douglas, 1847

= Ancylis geminana =

Species of moth

Ancylis geminana, the festooned roller, is a moth of the family Tortricidae. It was described by Edward Donovan in 1806. It is found in most of Europe and has also been recorded from North America. The habitat consists of fens, marshes and damp heathland.

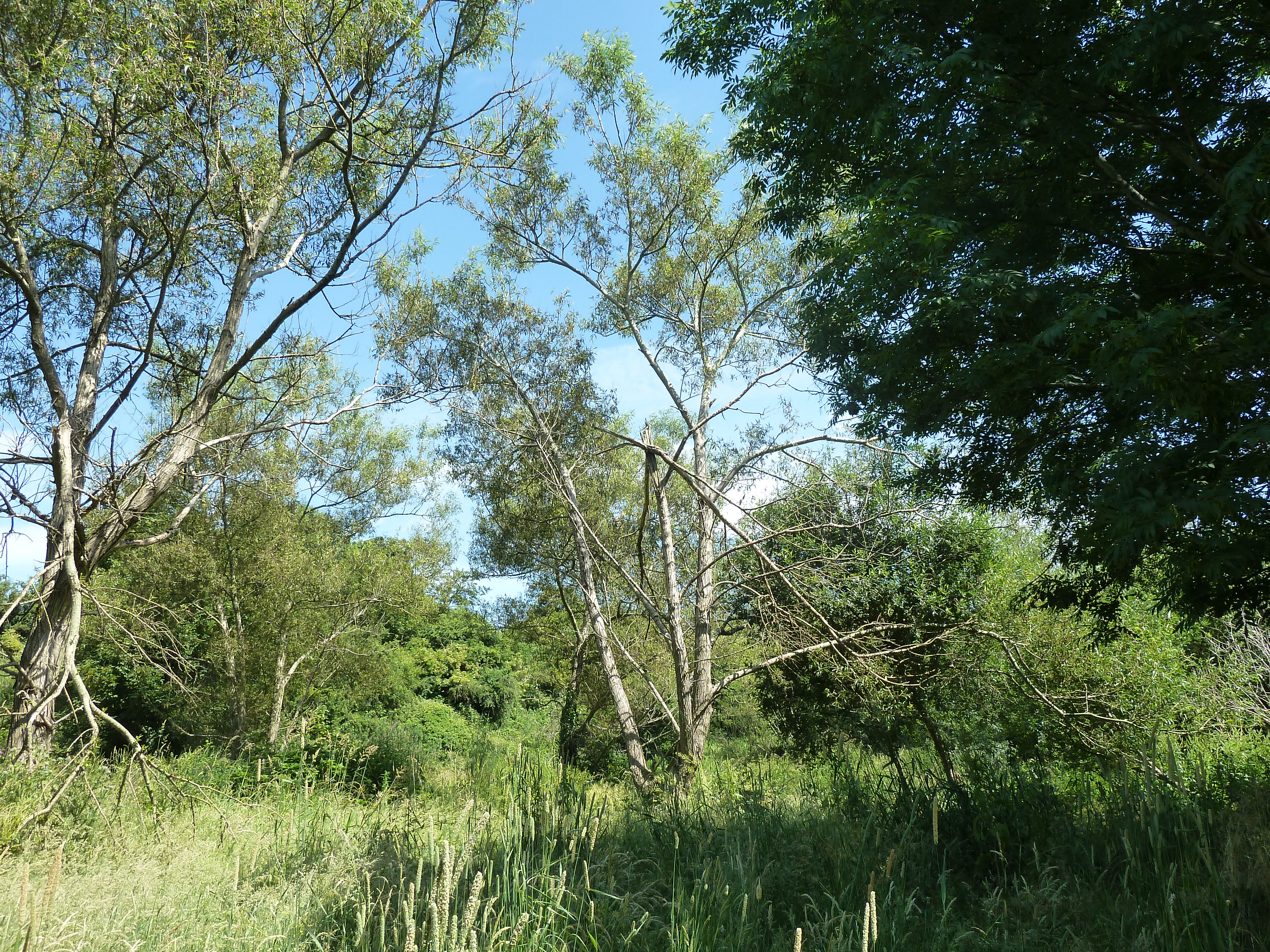
Habitat Ireland

The wingspan is 14–20 mm. The head is pale pinkish ochreous or white. The forewings are red-brownish [or ochreous or grey], more or less streaked with blackish in disc posteriorly . The costa is strigulated and anteriorly broadly suffused with whitish. There two or three elongate black subcostal dots towards base. The dorsal area is suffused with whitish, limited by a whitish line forming a subtriangular projection in the middle and a flat arch posteriorly, ending on the termen above middle. The hindwings are light grey. Julius von Kennel provides a full description.

Adults are on wing from May to August.

The larvae feed on Salix species, including Salix aurita, Salix repens and Salix cinerea. They live between leaves spun together with silk.
