= Ancylis stenampyx =

Scientific classification
- Kingdom: Animalia
- Phylum: Arthropoda
- Clade: Pancrustacea
- Class: Insecta
- Order: Lepidoptera
- Family: Tortricidae
- Genus: Ancylis
- Species: A. stenampyx

Binomial name
- Ancylis stenampyx Diakonoff, 1982

Synonyms
- Ancylis (Ancyloides) stenampyx Diakonoff, 1982

Species of moth

Ancylis stenampyx is a moth of the family Tortricidae first described by Alexey Diakonoff in 1982. It is found in Sri Lanka.

== Description ==
Adult male wingspan is 11 mm. Head pale ochreous. Palpus pale ochreous greyish. A longitudinal fuscous line runs along and above lower margin, edged on both sides with white. Antenna pale ochreous. Thorax pale greyish ochreous. Abdomen pale grey with pale orange anal tuft. Forewings narrow and oblong. Costa curved with pointed apex. Forewings are pale ochreous, with pale fulvous cloudy patches. Five small dark brown oblique marks present on lower half of costa. Remainder of the costa suffused with chestnut brown. This suffusion contain some 5-6 very narrow silvery-white, strongly outwards-oblique lines. Cilia pale fuscous-greyish. Hindwings pale fuscous grey with darker scaly tips. Cilia pale fuscous grey, with whitish base.
