= Ancylis rhenana =

Scientific classification
- Kingdom: Animalia
- Phylum: Arthropoda
- Class: Insecta
- Order: Lepidoptera
- Family: Tortricidae
- Genus: Ancylis
- Species: A. rhenana

Binomial name
- Ancylis rhenana Muller-Rütz, 1920

Species of moth

Ancylis rhenana is a moth belonging to the family Tortricidae. The species was first described by Johann Müller-Rutz in 1920.

It is native to Europe.
