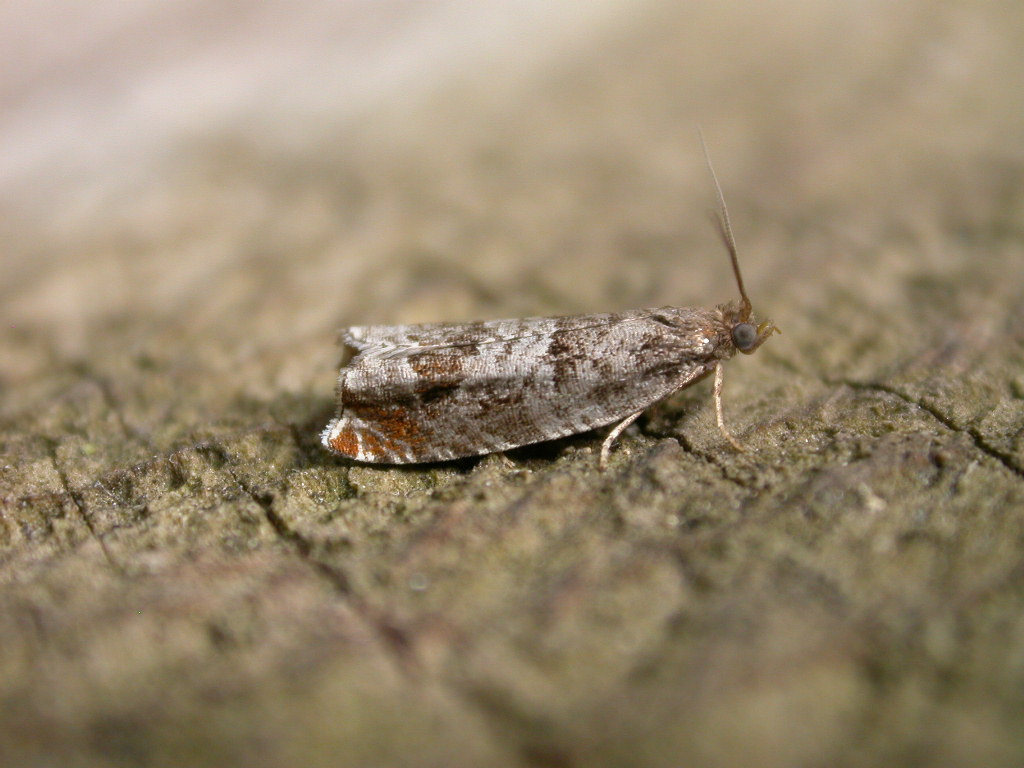

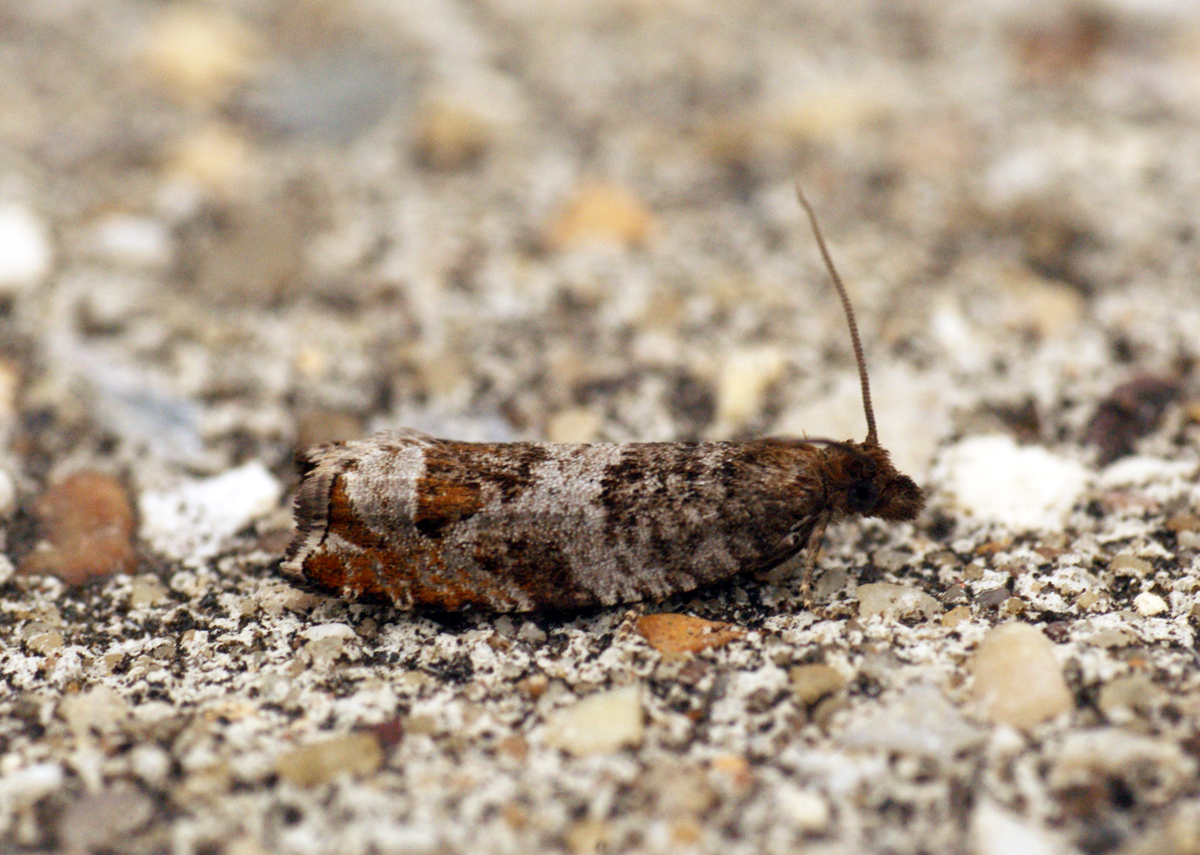

Scientific classification
- Domain: Eukaryota
- Kingdom: Animalia
- Phylum: Arthropoda
- Class: Insecta
- Order: Lepidoptera
- Family: Tortricidae
- Genus: Ancylis
- Species: A. achatana

Binomial name
- Ancylis achatana (Denis& Schiffermüller, 1775)

= Ancylis achatana =

Species of moth

Ancylis achatana is a moth of the family Tortricidae. It is found from central and southern Europe including the United Kingdom and Ireland, east to the Baltic region, Asia Minor, Ukraine and Russia to the southern part of Trans-Ural.

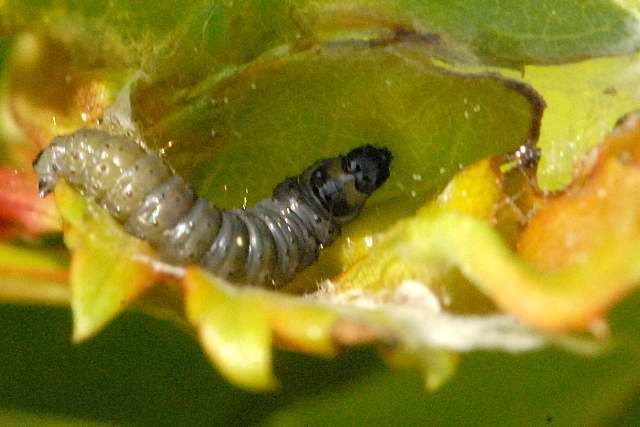
Larva

The wingspan is 14–18 mm. The forewings are fuscous with thick subconfluent pale leaden-metallic striae. The costa is posteriorly strigulated with whitish. The basal patch is dark fuscous, mixed with leaden-metallic, edge bent. The central fascia is dark fuscous, ferruginous-mixed, sharply obliquely interrupted with leaden-metallic above middle. A triangular apical ferruginous-orange patch is sprinkled with dark fuscous and cut by a leaden-metallic stria. The hindwings are grey. The larva is blackish; head and plate of 2 black. Julius von Kennel provides a full description.

Adults are on wing from June to July.

The larvae spin or roll together leaves of Crataegus or Prunus spinosa and feed within or nearby. Other recorded food plants include Prunus domestica, Prunus mahaleb, Cotoneaster, Pyrus communis, Malus domestica, Malus sylvestris, Rubus fruticosus, Salix caprea and Urtica.
