= Ancylis unculana =

Scientific classification
- Kingdom: Animalia
- Phylum: Arthropoda
- Clade: Pancrustacea
- Class: Insecta
- Order: Lepidoptera
- Family: Tortricidae
- Genus: Ancylis
- Species: A. unculana

Binomial name
- Ancylis unculana (Haworth, 1811)

Species of moth

Ancylis unculana is a moth belonging to the family Tortricidae. The species was first described by Adrian Hardy Haworth in 1811.

It is native to Europe.
