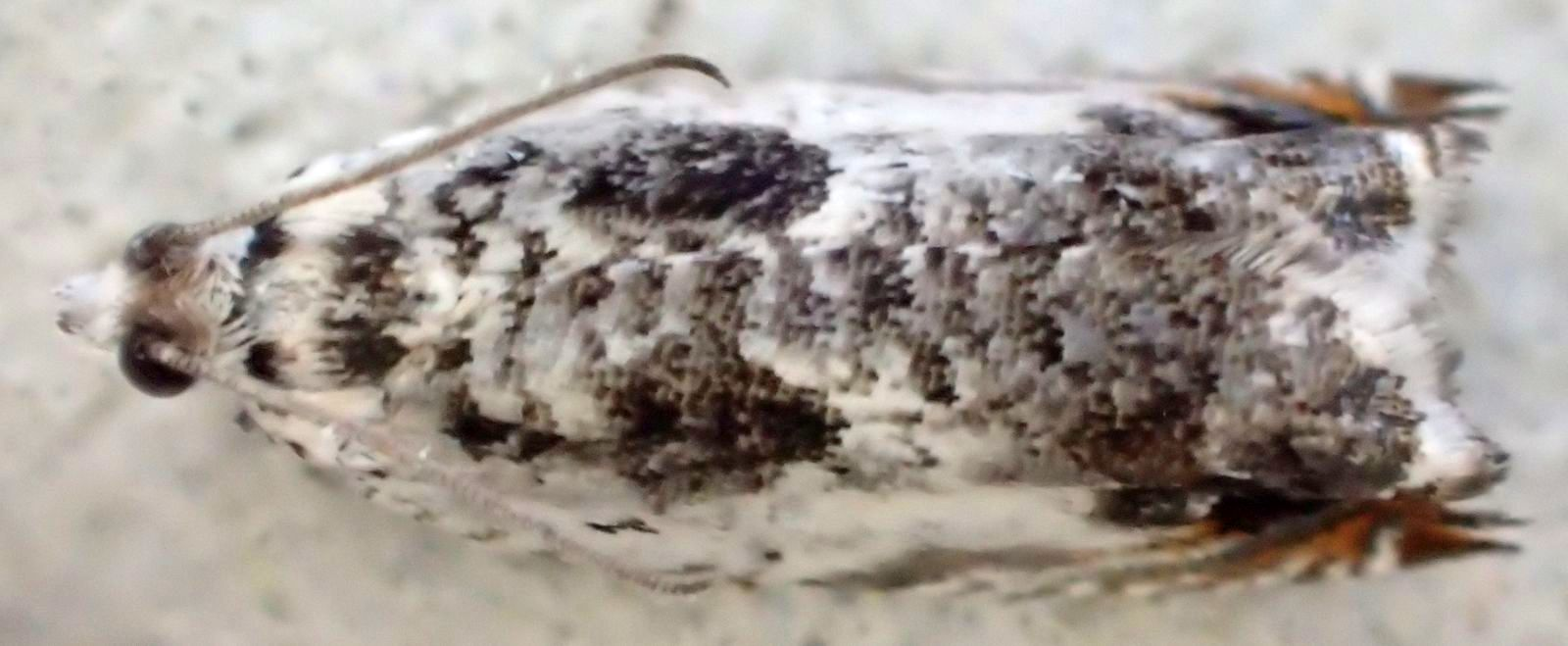

Scientific classification
- Kingdom: Animalia
- Phylum: Arthropoda
- Clade: Pancrustacea
- Class: Insecta
- Order: Lepidoptera
- Family: Tortricidae
- Genus: Ancylis
- Species: A. laetana

Binomial name
- Ancylis laetana (Fabricius, 1775)

Synonyms
- Pyralis laetana Fabricius, 1775; Tortrix harpana Hubner, [1796-1799]; Pyralis lactana Fabricius, 1781

= Ancylis laetana =

Species of moth

Ancylis laetana is a moth of the family Tortricidae. It is found in most of Europe, except the Iberian Peninsula, the Balkan Peninsula, Iceland, Ireland and Ukraine.

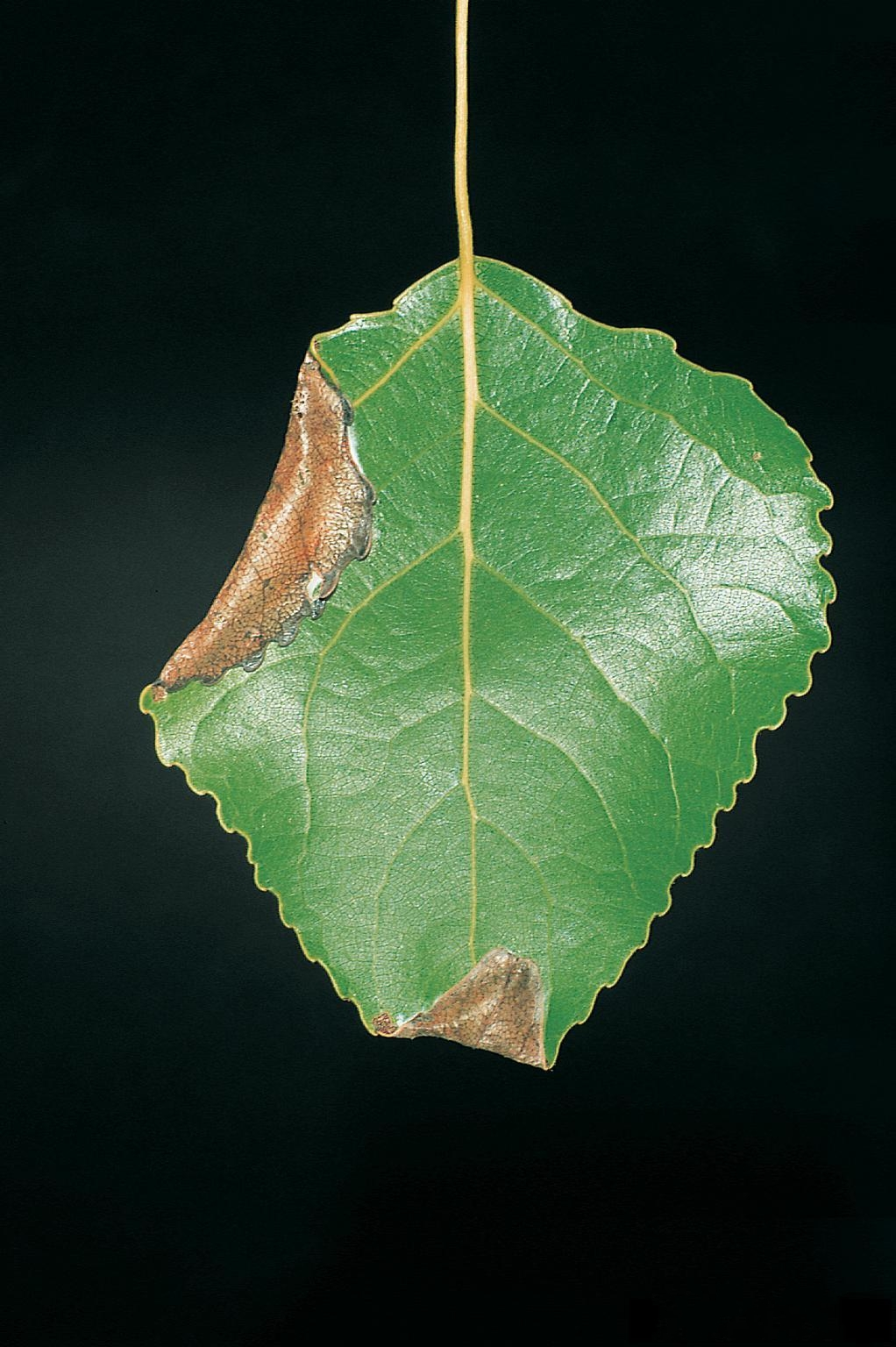
Damage

The wingspan is 14–18 mm. Adults are on wing from May to June in one generation per year.

The larvae feed on Populus tremula and occasionally Populus nigra.
