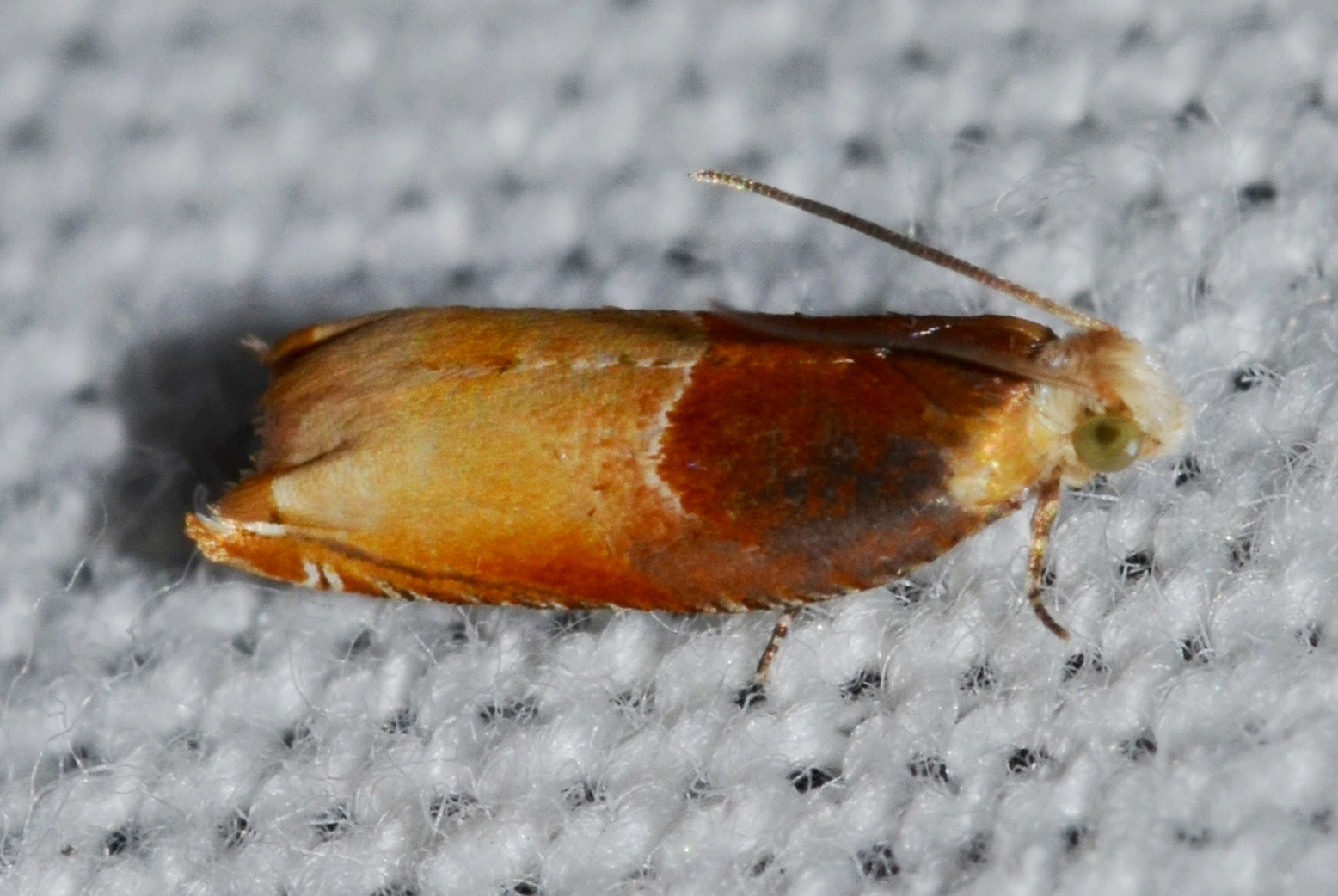

Scientific classification
- Kingdom: Animalia
- Phylum: Arthropoda
- Class: Insecta
- Order: Lepidoptera
- Family: Tortricidae
- Genus: Ancylis
- Species: A. divisana

Binomial name
- Ancylis divisana (Walker, 1863)

Synonyms
- Grapholita divisana Walker, 1863

= Ancylis divisana =

Species of moth

Ancylis divisana, the two-toned ancylis moth, is a moth of the family Tortricidae. It is found in North America, where it has been recorded from Alabama, Colorado, Florida, Georgia, Illinois, Kentucky, Maine, Maryland, Massachusetts, Michigan, Mississippi, North Carolina, Ohio, Oklahoma, Ontario, Pennsylvania, Quebec, South Carolina, Tennessee, Texas and West Virginia.

The wingspan is 10–13 mm. Adults have been recorded on wing from March to October.

The larvae feed on Carpinus species, Castanea dentata, Quercus species and Platanus species (including Platanus occidentalis).
