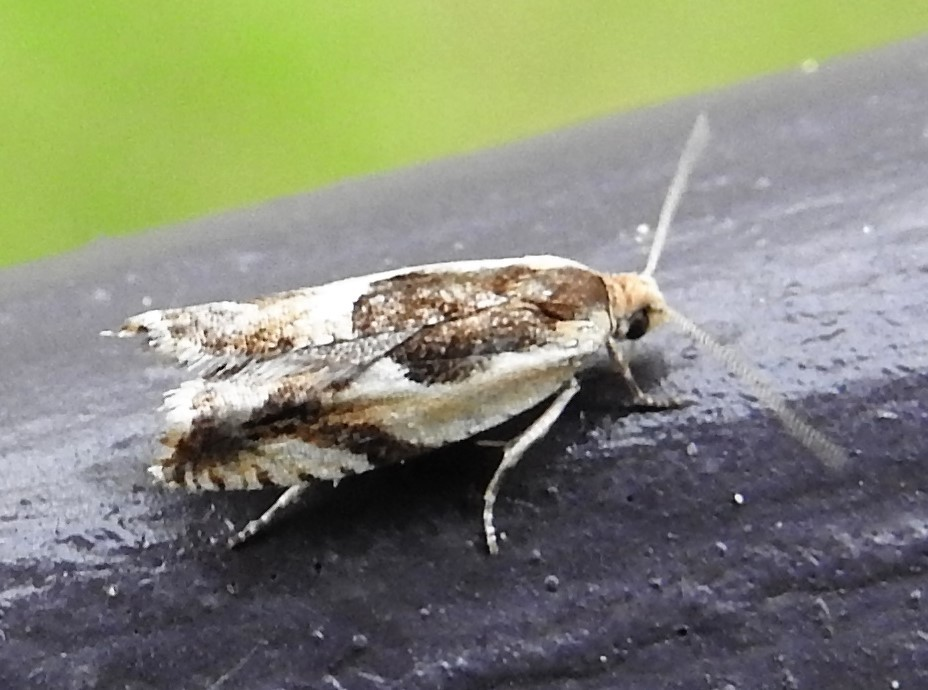
- Adult

Scientific classification
- Kingdom: Animalia
- Phylum: Arthropoda
- Clade: Pancrustacea
- Class: Insecta
- Order: Lepidoptera
- Family: Tortricidae
- Genus: Ancylis
- Species: A. discigerana

Binomial name
- Ancylis discigerana (Walker, 1863)

Synonyms
- Grapholita discigerana Walker, 1863

= Ancylis discigerana =

Species of moth

Ancylis discigerana, the birch leaffolder or yellow birch leaffolder moth, is a moth of the family Tortricidae. It is found in north-eastern North America.

The wingspan is 13–14 mm. There is one generation per year.

The larvae feed on Betula alleghaniensis.

== Gallery ==
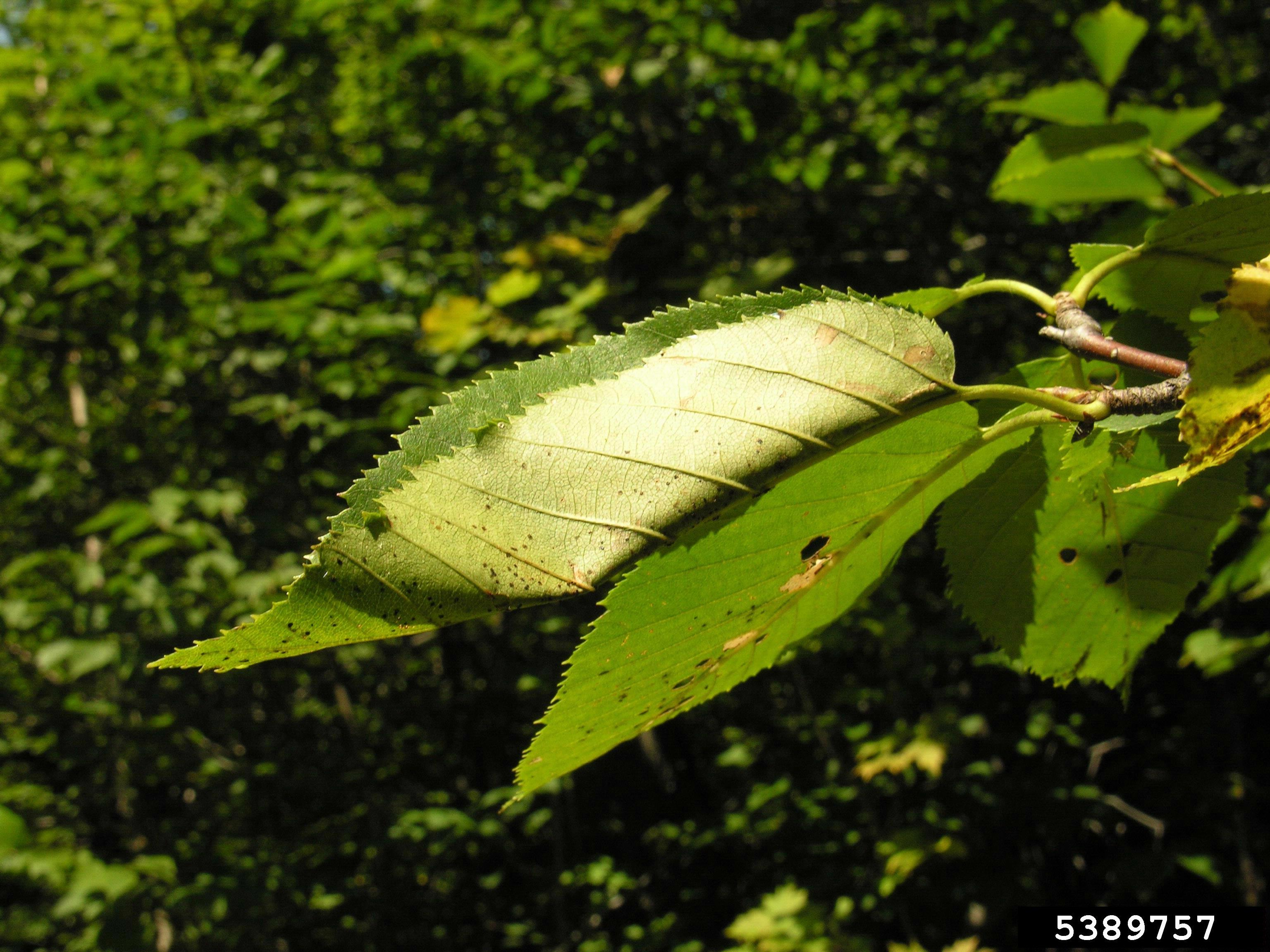
Damage

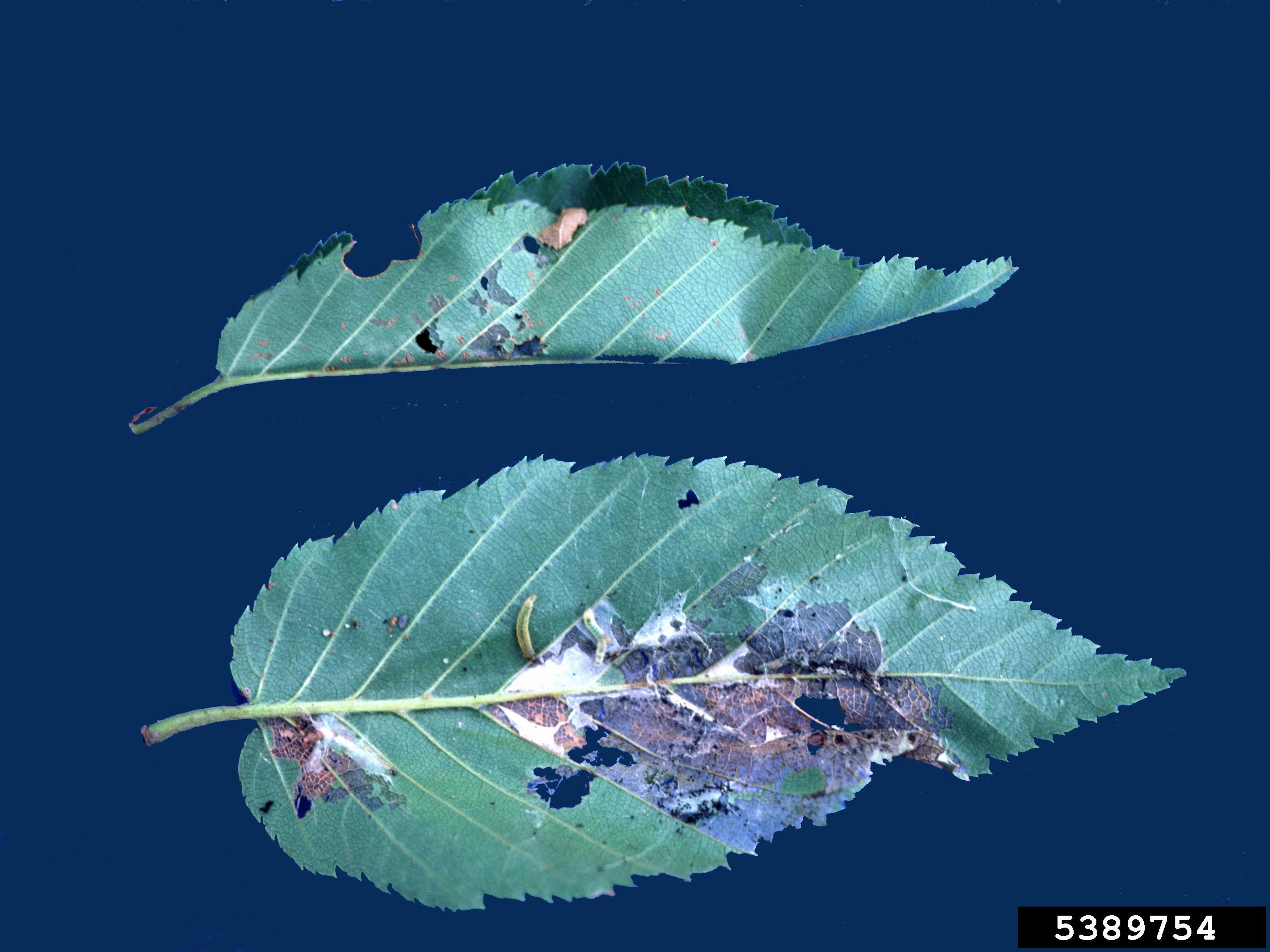
Damage

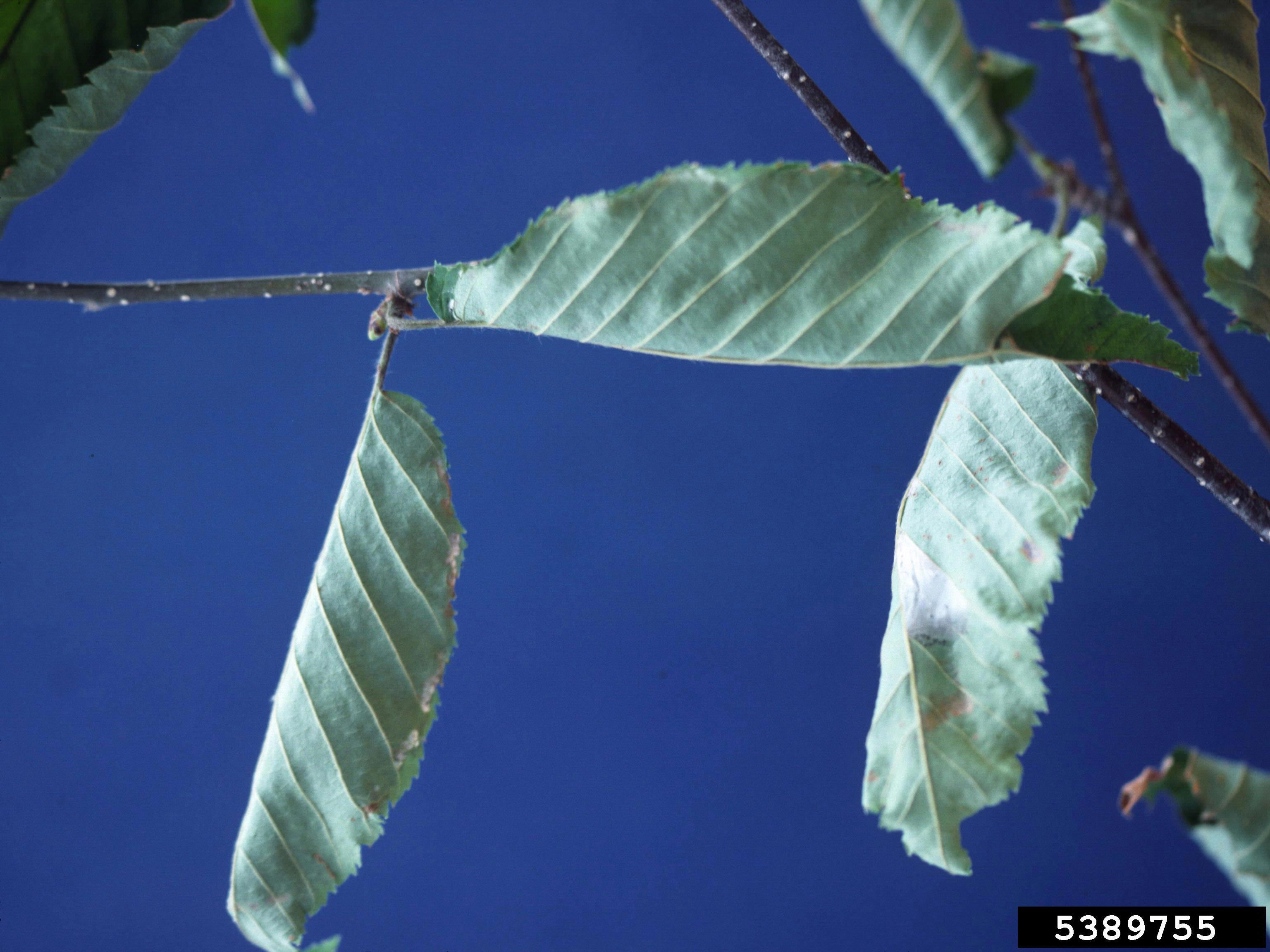
Damage

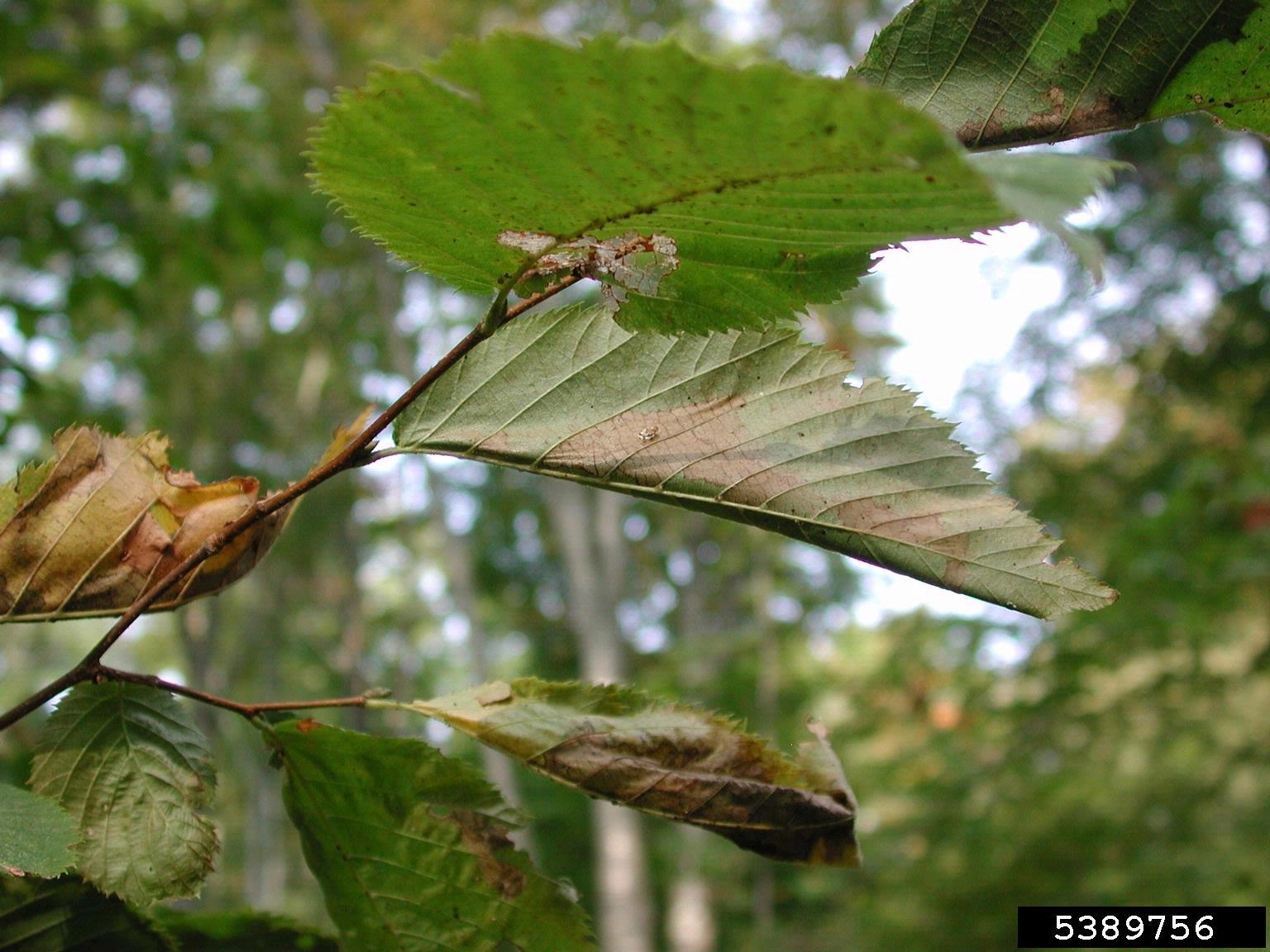
Damage
