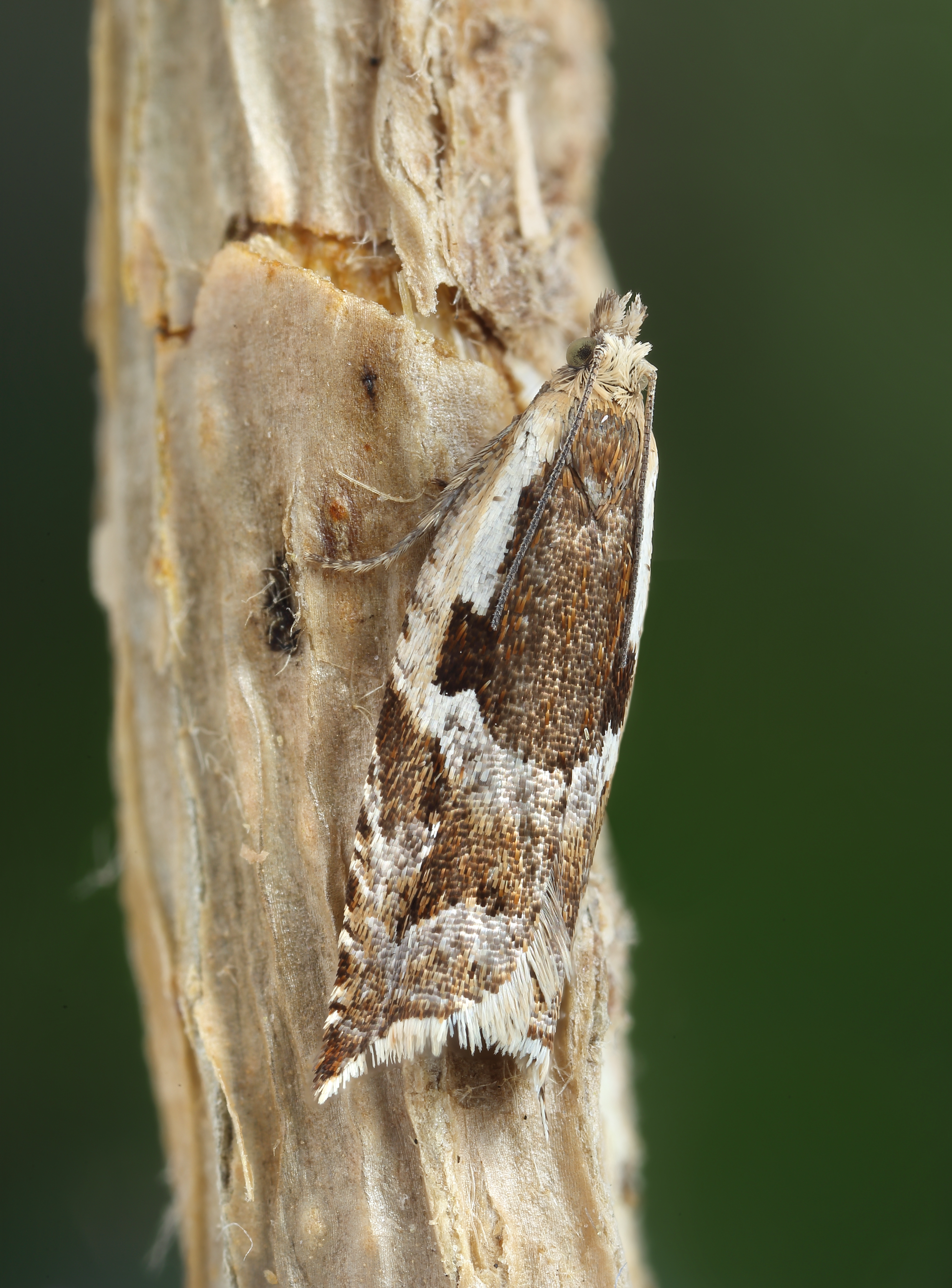

Scientific classification
- Kingdom: Animalia
- Phylum: Arthropoda
- Class: Insecta
- Order: Lepidoptera
- Family: Tortricidae
- Genus: Ancylis
- Species: A. myrtillana

Binomial name
- Ancylis myrtillana (Treitschke, [1830])

Synonyms
- Phoxopteryx myrtillana Treitschke, 1830; Anchylopera myrtillana f. bidentana Strand, 1901; Ancylis myrtillana coeneni Gibeaux, 1985; Phoxopteryx dentana Laharpe, 1858; Anchylopera myrtillana f. distracta Strand, 1901

= Ancylis myrtillana =

Species of moth

Ancylis myrtillana is a moth of the family Tortricidae. It was described by Treitschke in 1830. It is found in most of Europe and across the Palearctic.It has also been recorded in North America. The habitat consists of moorland.

The wingspan is 12–16 mm. The forewings are ochreous or pale brownish, sometimes striated with whitish. The costa is posteriorly spotted with dark fuscous and there is a rather dark fuscous irregularly triangular dorsal blotch extending from base to beyond middle, the surrounding space sometimes wholly whitish. The central fascia is ochreous-brownish, with a wedge-shaped posterior projection upwards from below middle, marked with one or two black dashes in middle. The hindwings are grey. Julius von Kennel provides a full description.

Adults are on wing from May to July in one generation per year.

The larvae feed on Vaccinium myrtillus, Vaccinium vitis-idaea and Vaccinium uliginosum. They feed from within a pod, created by spinning two leaves together. The species overwinters as a final instar larvae within a cocoon made in litter.
