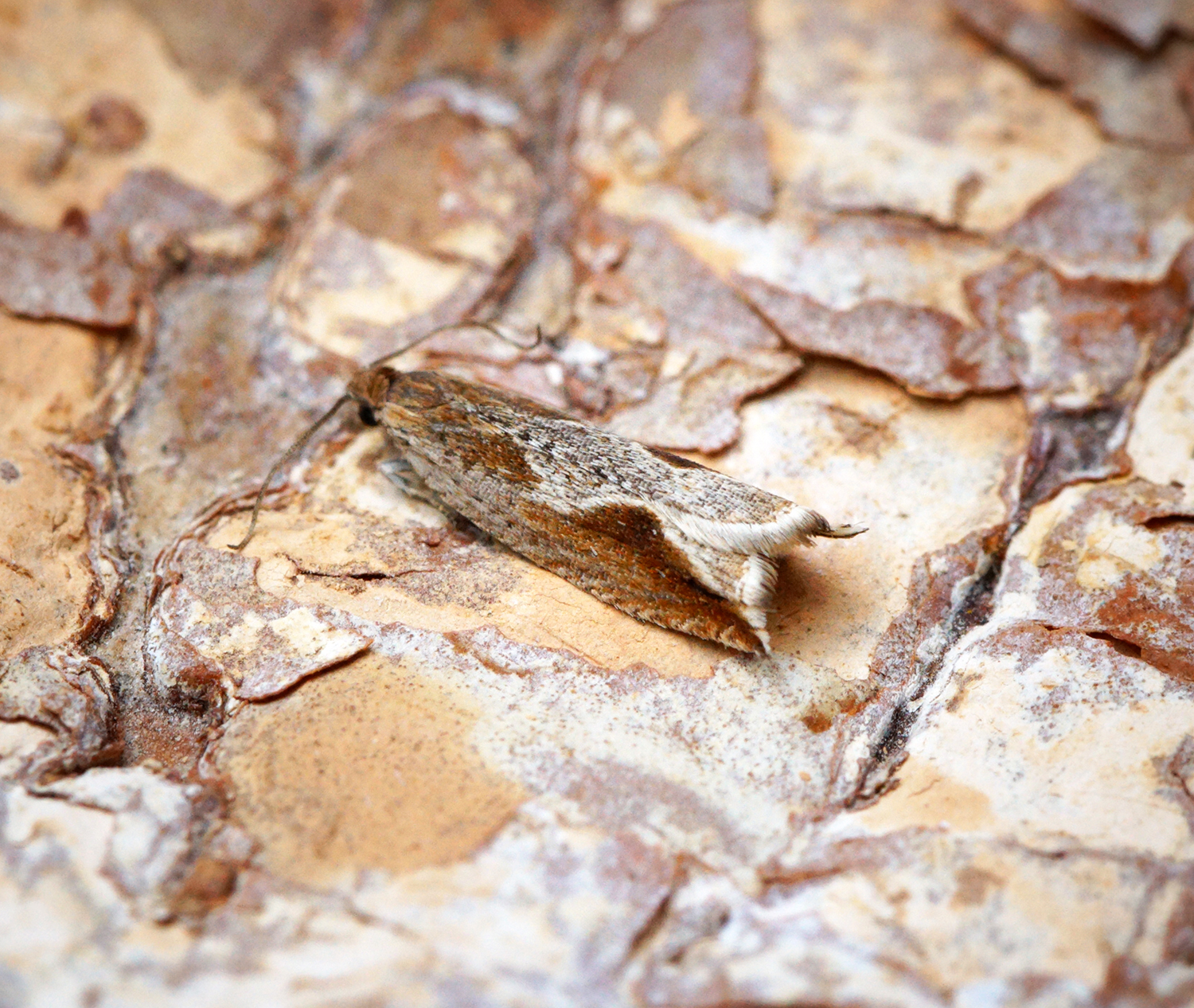

Scientific classification
- Kingdom: Animalia
- Phylum: Arthropoda
- Class: Insecta
- Order: Lepidoptera
- Family: Tortricidae
- Genus: Ancylis
- Species: A. diminutana

Binomial name
- Ancylis diminutana (Haworth, [1811)])

Synonyms
- Tortrix diminutana Haworth, [1811]

= Ancylis diminutana =

Species of moth

Ancylis diminutana, the small festooned roller, is a moth of the family Tortricidae. It was described by Adrian Hardy Haworth in 1811. In Europe, it has been recorded from Great Britain, Ireland, the Benelux, Scandinavia, the Baltic region, Russia, Poland, the Czech Republic, Hungary, Romania, Slovenia and Switzerland. It is also found in North America.

The wingspan is 13–15 mm. Julius von Kennel provides a full description. Adults are on wing from May to August.
