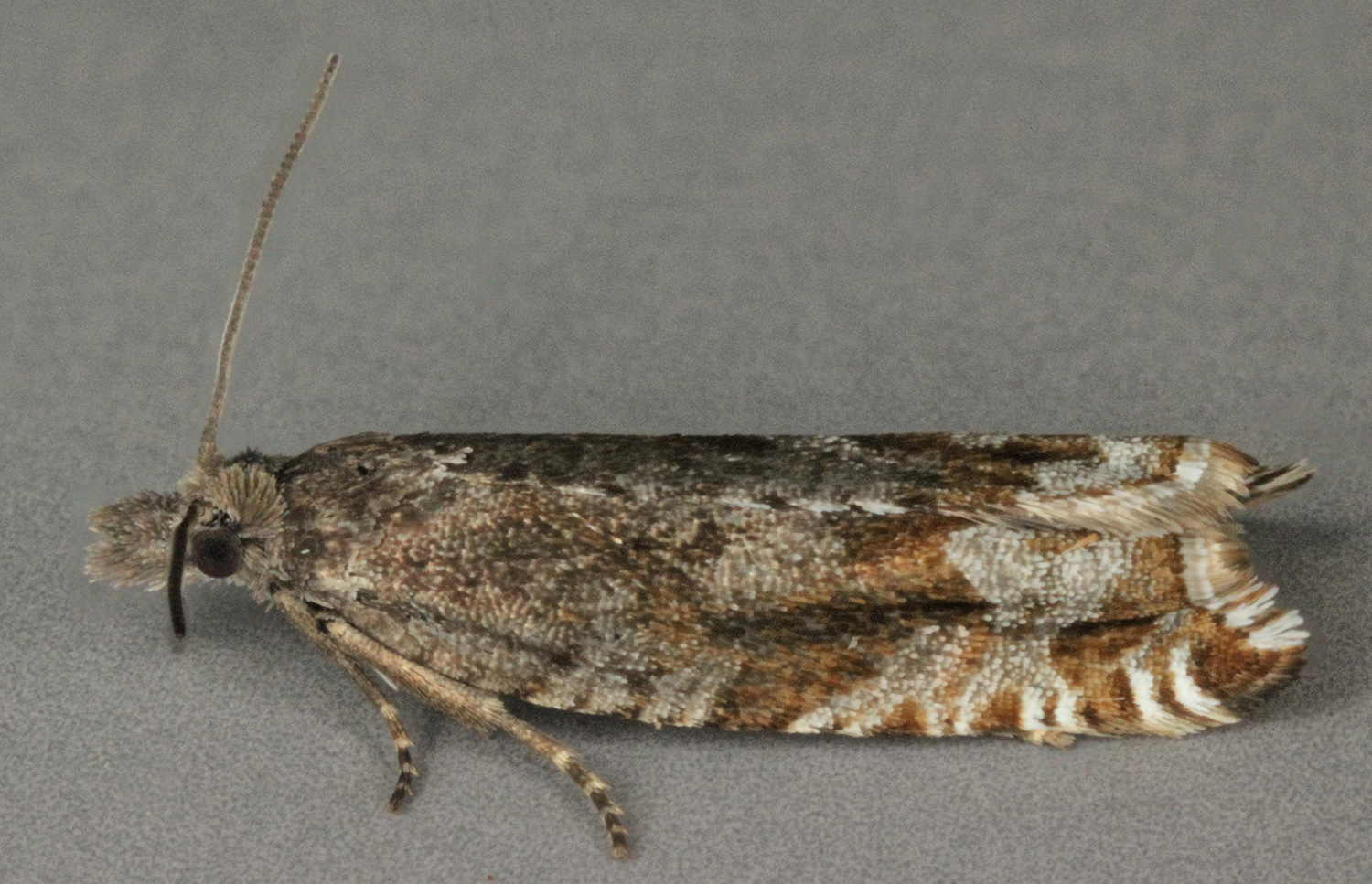

Scientific classification
- Kingdom: Animalia
- Phylum: Arthropoda
- Clade: Pancrustacea
- Class: Insecta
- Order: Lepidoptera
- Family: Tortricidae
- Genus: Ancylis
- Species: A. unguicella

Binomial name
- Ancylis unguicella (Linnaeus, 1758)

= Ancylis unguicella =

Species of moth

Ancylis unguicella is a moth belonging to the family Tortricidae. The species was first described by Carl Linnaeus in his landmark 1758 10th edition of Systema Naturae.

It is native to the Palearctic and North America.

The wingspan is 13-18 mm. The ground colour of the forewings is whitish, sprinkled or sometimes suffused with light fuscous and more or less striated with brown. The costa is strigulated with dark fuscous and whitish. The edge of the basal patch is obliquely rounded and it is less marked towards the costa. The narrow central fascia has a short posterior median projection, and a subapical transverse streak triangularly dilated towards the termen. It is ochreous-fuscous or dark fuscous. The hindwings are grey. Julius von Kennel provides a full description.

The larvae feed on Calluna vulgaris and Erica cinerea. The adult butterflies fly between May and July.
