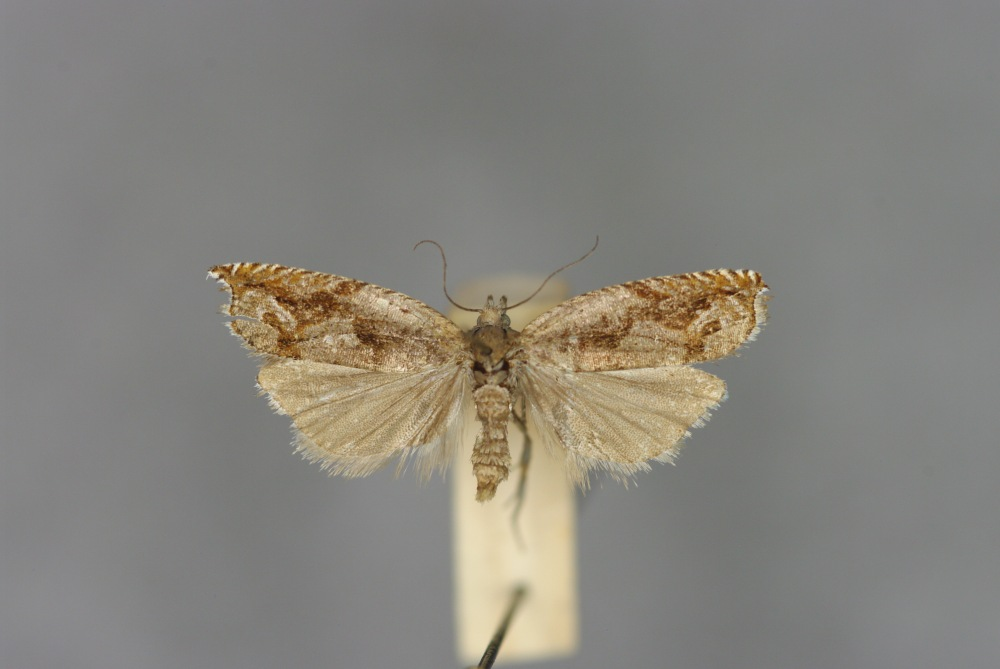
- Ancylis uncella Salzburg, Alpenvorland

Scientific classification
- Domain: Eukaryota
- Kingdom: Animalia
- Phylum: Arthropoda
- Class: Insecta
- Order: Lepidoptera
- Family: Tortricidae
- Genus: Ancylis
- Species: A. uncella

Binomial name
- Ancylis uncella (Denis & Schiffermüller, 1775)

= Ancylis uncella =

Species of moth

Ancylis uncella is a moth belonging to the family Tortricidae. The species was first described by Michael Denis and Ignaz Schiffermüller in 1775.

== Characteristics ==
The wingspan is 15–20 mm. The ground colour of the forewings is reddish brown with two grey dorsal spots and with short, light costal lines. The hindwings are pale brown.

It is native to most of the Palearctic (including Europe) and Northern America.

The larvae feed on Betula spp. and Calluna vulgaris. The moth flies in May–June.
