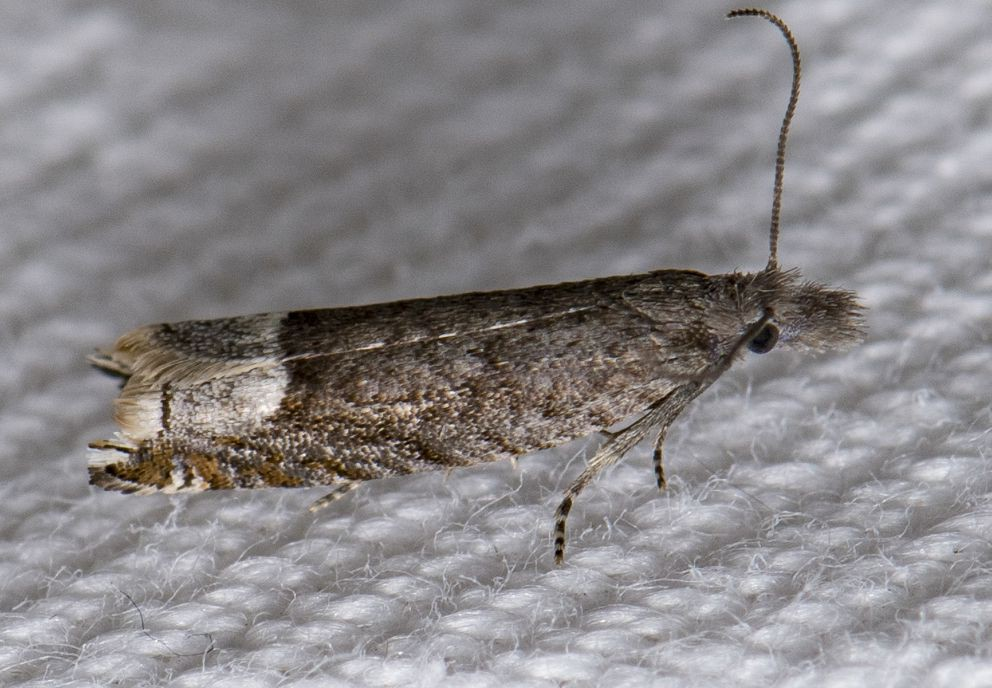

Scientific classification
- Kingdom: Animalia
- Phylum: Arthropoda
- Clade: Pancrustacea
- Class: Insecta
- Order: Lepidoptera
- Family: Tortricidae
- Genus: Ancylis
- Species: A. tineana

Binomial name
- Ancylis tineana (Hübner, 1799)

Synonyms
- Ancylis ocellana (Clemens, 1864); Ancylis leucophaleratana (Packard, 1866)

= Ancylis tineana =

Species of moth

Ancylis tineana is a moth of the family Tortricidae. It is found from southern Sweden to Asia Minor and from the Trans-Caucasus to Siberia and the southern part of eastern Russia. It is also present in North America.

The wingspan is 11–15 mm. In Europe, there are two generations per year, with adults on wing from April to May and from July to August.

The larvae feed on Malus, Pyrus, Crataegus, Prunus spinosa, Prunus domestica, Betula and Populus tremula. Larvae can occasionally become a pest in orchards.
