= Ancylis ancorata =

Scientific classification
- Kingdom: Animalia
- Phylum: Arthropoda
- Class: Insecta
- Order: Lepidoptera
- Family: Tortricidae
- Genus: Ancylis
- Species: A. ancorata

Binomial name
- Ancylis ancorata Meyrick, 1912

Species of moth

Ancylis ancorata is a moth of the family Tortricidae first described by Edward Meyrick in 1912. It is found on the Konkan Coast of western India. and Sri Lanka.

== Description ==
Adult male wingspan is 12–13 mm. It is metallic in nature.
