= Ancylis kenneli =

Scientific classification
- Domain: Eukaryota
- Kingdom: Animalia
- Phylum: Arthropoda
- Class: Insecta
- Order: Lepidoptera
- Family: Tortricidae
- Genus: Ancylis
- Species: A. kenneli

Binomial name
- Ancylis kenneli Kuznetsov, 1962

Species of moth

Ancylis kenneli is a moth belonging to the family Tortricidae. The species was first described by Vladimir Ivanovitsch Kuznetzov in 1962.

It is native to Eurasia.
