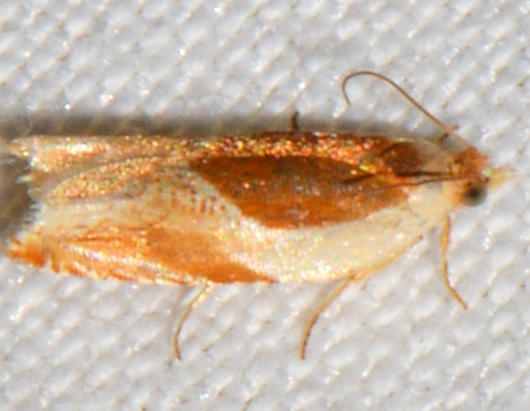

Scientific classification
- Kingdom: Animalia
- Phylum: Arthropoda
- Class: Insecta
- Order: Lepidoptera
- Family: Tortricidae
- Genus: Ancylis
- Species: A. mira

Binomial name
- Ancylis mira Heinrich, 1929

= Ancylis mira =

Species of moth

Ancylis mira is a species of tortricid moth in the family Tortricidae.

The MONA or Hodges number for Ancylis mira is 3368.
