= Ancylis argillacea =

Scientific classification
- Kingdom: Animalia
- Phylum: Arthropoda
- Class: Insecta
- Order: Lepidoptera
- Family: Tortricidae
- Genus: Ancylis
- Species: A. argillacea

Binomial name
- Ancylis argillacea (Turner, 1916)

Synonyms
- Lamyrodes argillacea Turner, 1916

Species of moth

Ancylis argillacea is a species of moth of the family Tortricidae. It is found in Australia, where it has been recorded from New South Wales.

The wingspan is about 12 mm. The forewings are pale ferruginous fuscous, the costa strigulated (finely streaked) with whitish and fuscous. The hindwings are grey.
