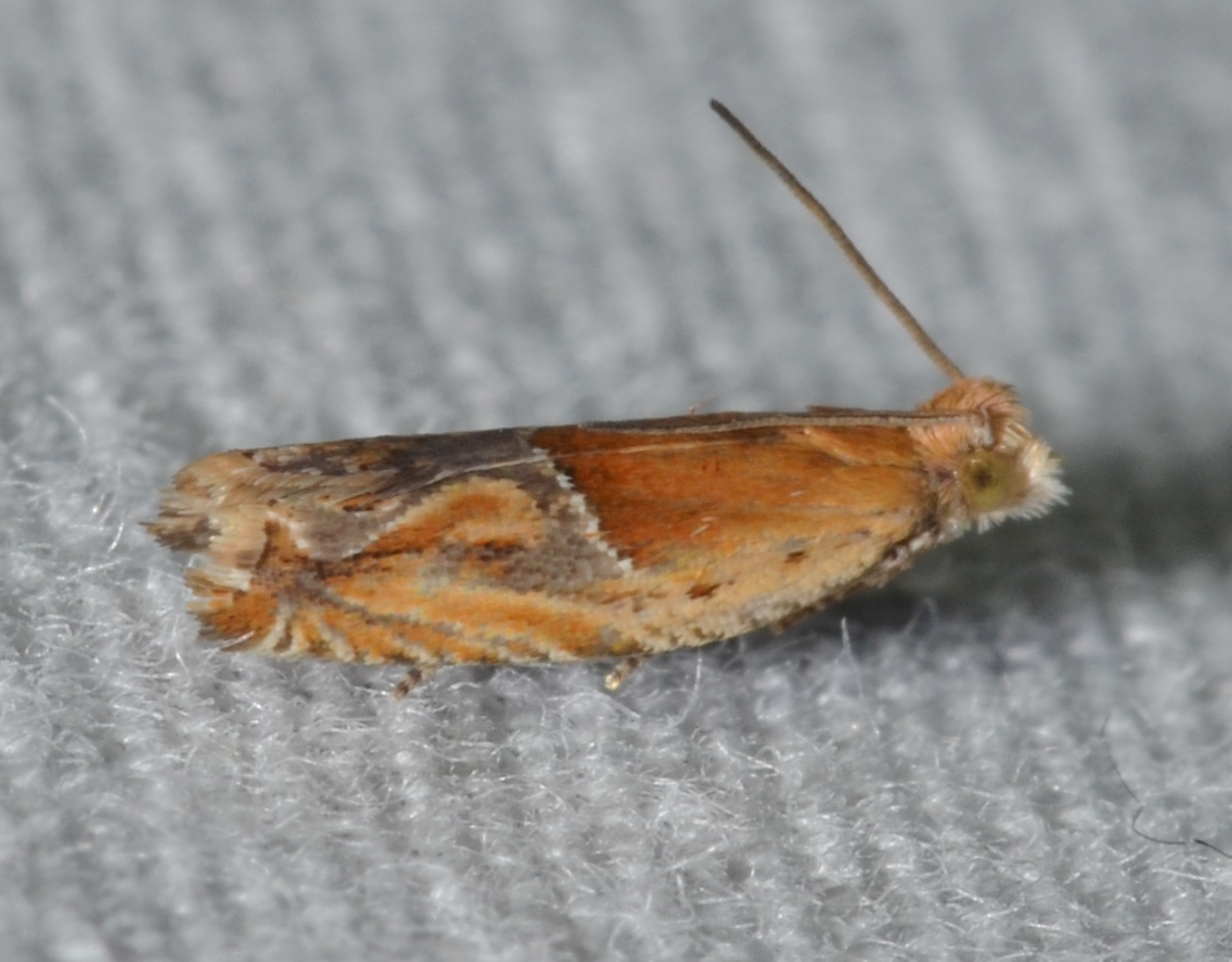

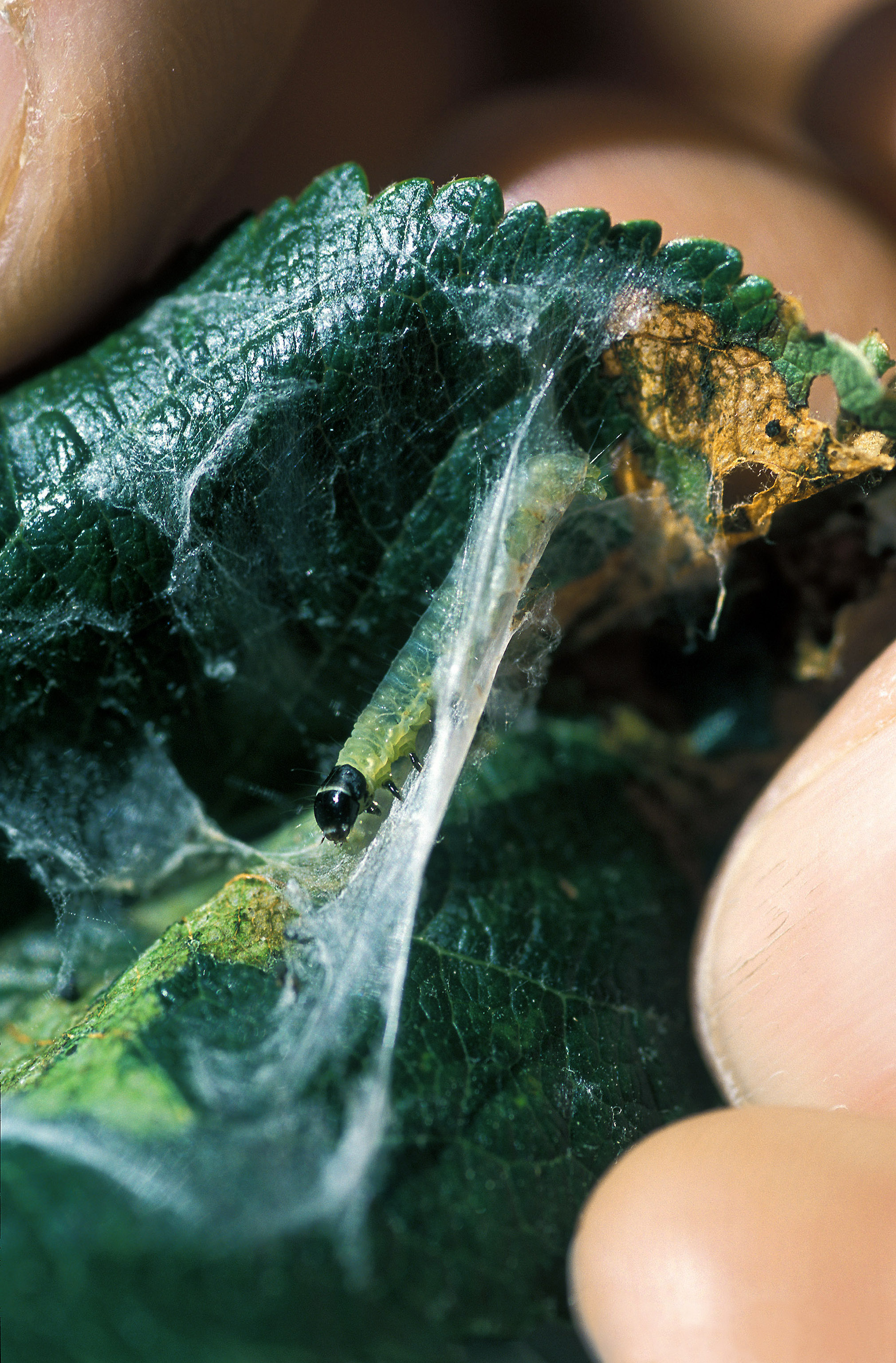
- A strawberry leaf is unrolled to reveal a strawberry leafroller

Scientific classification
- Kingdom: Animalia
- Phylum: Arthropoda
- Class: Insecta
- Order: Lepidoptera
- Family: Tortricidae
- Genus: Ancylis
- Species: A. comptana

Binomial name
- Ancylis comptana (Frölich, 1828)

Synonyms
- Ancylis conflexana (Walker, 1863); Ancylis pulchellana (Clemens, 1864); Ancylis lamiana (Clemens, 1864); Ancylis fragariae (Walsh & Riley, 1869); Ancylis amblygona (Zeller, 1875); Ancylis floridana (Zeller, 1875); Ancylis cometana (Walsingham, 1879)

= Ancylis comptana =

Species of moth

Ancylis comptana, the strawberry leaf-roller or Comptan's ancylis moth, is a moth of the family Tortricidae. It is found from the United Kingdom and Scandinavia to northern Spain and Turkey, Asia Minor, Kazakhstan, Uzbekistan, Russia, China, Mongolia, Korea and Japan. In North America, it is represented by ssp. fragariae.

The wingspan is 11–14 mm. Adults are on wing from April to June and from mid-July until September. There are two generations per year in Europe. In the northern United States, moths of the first generation fly from the end of March to April and those of the second in late May and June. Here, a third or sometimes even a fourth generation occurs, flying in August and from September to October.

The larvae feed on Sanguisorba minor, Potentilla, Fragaria, Teucrium, Rosa, Dryas octopetala, Rubus idaeus, Rubus icaesius and Thymus.

== Subspecies ==
- Ancylis comptana comptana (Eurasia)
- Ancylis comptana fragariae (North America)
