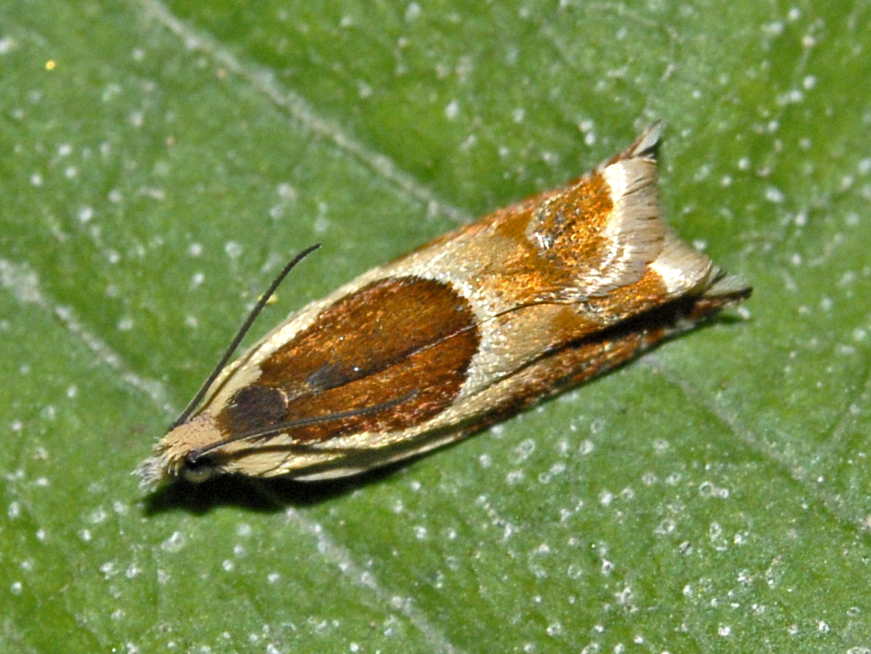
- Ancylis badiana

Scientific classification
- Kingdom: Animalia
- Phylum: Arthropoda
- Clade: Pancrustacea
- Class: Insecta
- Order: Lepidoptera
- Family: Tortricidae
- Subfamily: Olethreutinae
- Tribe: Enarmoniini
- Genus: Ancylis; Hübner, [1825]

Synonyms
- LamyrodesMeryck, 1910; PhoxopterisTreitschke, 1829

= Ancylis =

Genus of tortrix moths

Ancylis is a genus of moths belonging to the subfamily Olethreutinae of the family Tortricidae.

== Species ==
- Ancylis achatana Denis & Schiffermüller, 1775
- Ancylis acromochla Turner, 1946
- Ancylis albacostana Kearfott, 1905
- Ancylis albafascia Heinrich, 1929
- Ancylis amplimacula Falkovitsh, 1965
- Ancylis ancorata Meyrick, 1912
- Ancylis anguillana Meyrick, 1881
- Ancylis anthophanes Meyrick, 1928
- Ancylis anthracaspis Meyrick, in Caradja, 1931
- Ancylis apicana Walker, 1866
- Ancylis apicella Denis & Schiffermüller, 1775
- Ancylis apicipicta Oku, 2005
- Ancylis arcitenens Meyrick, 1922
- Ancylis argenticiliana Walsingham, 1897
- Ancylis argillacea Turner, 1916
- Ancylis aromatias Meyrick, 1912
- Ancylis artifica Meyrick, 1911
- Ancylis atricapilla Meyrick, 1917
- Ancylis badiana Denis & Schiffermüller, 1775
- Ancylis bauhiniae Busck, 1934
- Ancylis biscissana Meyrick, 1881
- Ancylis brauni Heinrich, 1931
- Ancylis bucovinella Peiu & Nemes, 1969
- Ancylis burgessiana Zeller, 1875
- Ancylis carbonana Heinrich, 1923
- Ancylis carpalima Meyrick, 1911
- Ancylis caudifer Stringer, 1929
- Ancylis celerata Meyrick, 1912
- Ancylis charisema Meyrick, 1934
- Ancylis colonota Meyrick, 1911
- Ancylis columbiana McDunnough, 1955
- Ancylis comptana Frolich, 1828
- Ancylis comptanoides Strand, 1920
- Ancylis convergens Diakonoff, 1984
- Ancylis cordiae Busck, 1934
- Ancylis cornifoliana Riley, 1881
- Ancylis coronopa Meyrick, 1911
- Ancylis corylicolana Kuznetzov, 1962
- Ancylis definitivana Heinrich, 1923
- Ancylis diminutana Haworth, 1811
- Ancylis discigerana Walker, 1863
- Ancylis divisana Walker, 1863
- Ancylis enneametra Meyrick, 1927
- Ancylis erythrana Meyrick, 1881
- Ancylis erythrosema Turner, 1945
- Ancylis falcata Walsingham, 1891
- Ancylis falsicoma Meyrick, 1914
- Ancylis fergusoni McDunnough, 1958
- Ancylis fidana Meyrick, 1881
- Ancylis floridana Zeller, 1875
- Ancylis forsterana Bachmaier, 1965
- Ancylis fuscociliana Clemens, 1864
- Ancylis galeamatana McDunnough, 1956
- Ancylis geminana Donovan, 1806
- Ancylis gigas Razowski, 2009
- Ancylis glycyphaga Meyrick, 1912
- Ancylis goodelliana Fernald, 1882
- Ancylis habeleri Huemer & Tarmann, 1997
- Ancylis halisparta Meyrick, 1910
- Ancylis hemicatharta Meyrick, in Caradja & Meyrick, 1935
- Ancylis hibbertiana Meyrick, 1881
- Ancylis himerodana Meyrick, 1881
- Ancylis hygroberylla Meyrick in Caradja & Meyrick, 1937
- Ancylis hylaea Meyrick, 1912
- Ancylis impatiens Meyrick, 1921
- Ancylis infectana Meyrick, 1881
- Ancylis karafutonis Matsumura, 1911
- Ancylis kenneli Kuznetzov, 1962
- Ancylis kincaidiana Fernald, 1900
- Ancylis kurentzovi Kuznetzov, 1969
- Ancylis laciniana Zeller, 1875
- Ancylis laetana Fabricius, 1775
- Ancylis limosa Oku, 2005
- Ancylis loktini Kuznetzov, 1969
- Ancylis lomholdti Kawabe, 1989
- Ancylis longestriata Durrant, 1891
- Ancylis luana Laharpe, 1864
- Ancylis lutescens Meyrick, 1912
- Ancylis mandarinana Walsingham, 1900
- Ancylis maritima Dyar, 1904
- Ancylis mediofasciana Clemens, 1864
- Ancylis melanostigma Kuznetzov, 1970
- Ancylis mesoscia Meyrick, 1911
- Ancylis metamelana Walker, 1863
- Ancylis minimana Caradja, 1916
- Ancylis mira Heinrich, 1929
- Ancylis mitterbacheriana Denis & Schiffermüller, 1775
- Ancylis monochroa Diakonoff, 1984
- Ancylis muricana Walsingham, 1879
- Ancylis myrtillana Treitschke, 1830
- Ancylis natalana Walsingham, 1881
- Ancylis nemorana Kuznetzov, 1969
- Ancylis nomica Walsingham, 1914
- Ancylis nubeculana Clemens, 1860
- Ancylis obtusana Haworth, [1811]
- Ancylis oculifera Walsingham, 1891
- Ancylis oestobola Diakonoff, 1984
- Ancylis pacificana Walsingham, 1879
- Ancylis paludana Barrett, 1871
- Ancylis partitana Christoph, 1882
- Ancylis phileris Meyrick, 1910
- Ancylis platanana Clemens, 1860
- Ancylis plumbata Clarke, 1951
- Ancylis pseustis Meyrick, 1911
- Ancylis repandana Kennel, 1901
- Ancylis rhacodyta Meyrick, 1938
- Ancylis rhenana Müller-Rutz, 1920
- Ancylis rhoderana McDunnough, 1954
- Ancylis rimosa Meyrick, 1921
- Ancylis sativa Liu, 1979
- Ancylis sciodelta Meyrick, 1921
- Ancylis sederana Chrétien, 1915
- Ancylis segetana Meyrick, 1881
- Ancylis selenana Guenée, 1845
- Ancylis semiovana Zeller, 1875
- Ancylis shastensis McDunnough, 1955
- Ancylis sheppardana McDunnough, 1956
- Ancylis simuloides McDunnough, 1955
- Ancylis sophroniella Walsingham, 1907
- Ancylis sparulana Staudinger, 1859
- Ancylis spinicola Meyrick, 1927
- Ancylis spiraeifoliana Clemens, 1860
- Ancylis stenampyx Diakonoff, 1982
- Ancylis stilpna Turner, 1925
- Ancylis subaequana Zeller, 1875
- Ancylis synomotis Meyrick, 1911
- Ancylis tenebrica Heinrich, 1929
- Ancylis thalera Meyrick, 1907
- Ancylis tineana Hübner, 1796-1799
- Ancylis torontana Kearfott, 1907
- Ancylis transientana Filipjev, 1926
- Ancylis tumida Meyrick, 1912
- Ancylis uncella Denis & Schiffermüller, 1775
- Ancylis unculana Haworth, 1811
- Ancylis unguicella Linnaeus, 1758
- Ancylis upupana Treitschke, 1835
- Ancylis virididorsana Möschler, 1891
- Ancylis volutana Meyrick, 1881
- Ancylis youmiae Byun & Yan, 2005

== See also ==
- List of Tortricidae genera
