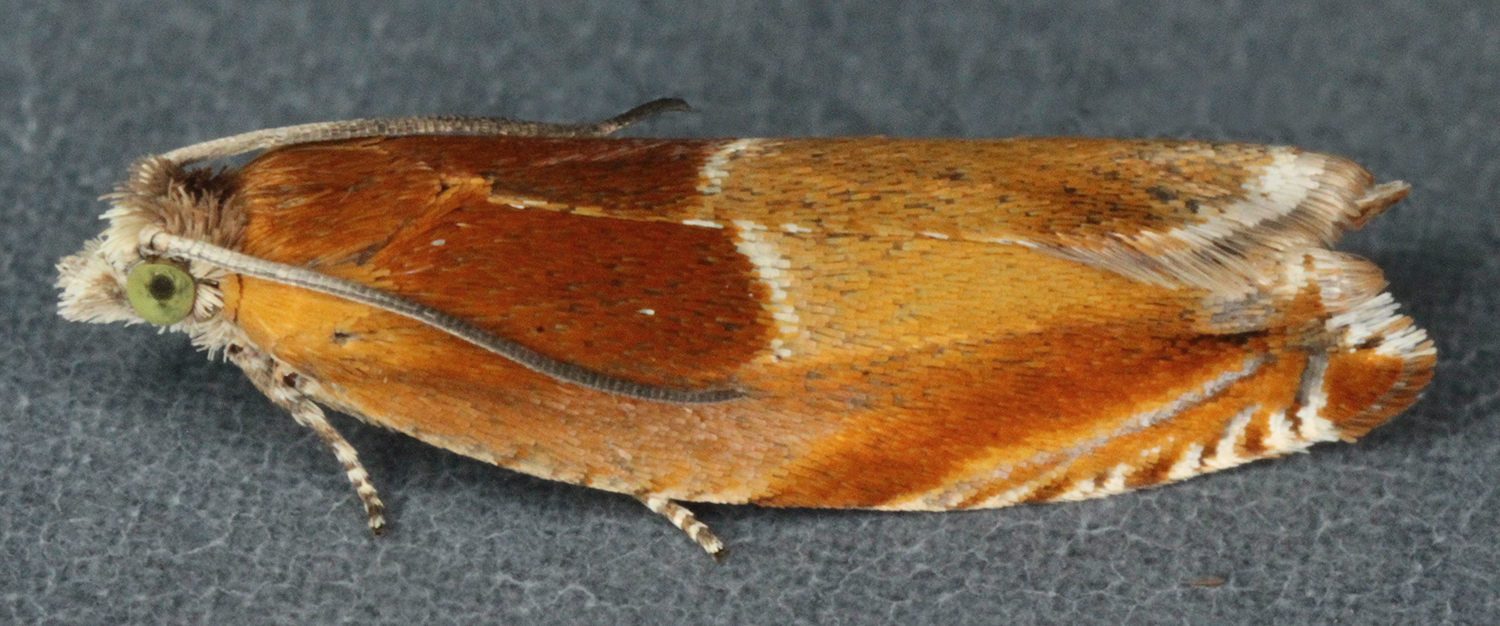
- Ancylis mitterbacheriana, Trawscoed, North Wales

Scientific classification
- Kingdom: Animalia
- Phylum: Arthropoda
- Clade: Pancrustacea
- Class: Insecta
- Order: Lepidoptera
- Family: Tortricidae
- Genus: Ancylis
- Species: A. mitterbacheriana

Binomial name
- Ancylis mitterbacheriana (Denis & Schiffermuller, 1775)

Synonyms
- Tortrix mitterbacheriana Denis & Schiffermuller, 1775; Pyralis mitterbachiana Fabricius, 1794; Grapholitha mitterbarchiana Duponchel, in Godart, 1834; Tortrix mitterpacheriana Frolich, 1828; Grapholitha mitterpachiana Treitschke, 1830; Tortrix subuncana Haworth, [1811]

= Ancylis mitterbacheriana =

Species of moth

Ancylis mitterbacheriana is a species of moth of the family Tortricidae. It is found in most of Europe, except the Iberian Peninsula, most of the Balkan Peninsula and Ukraine.

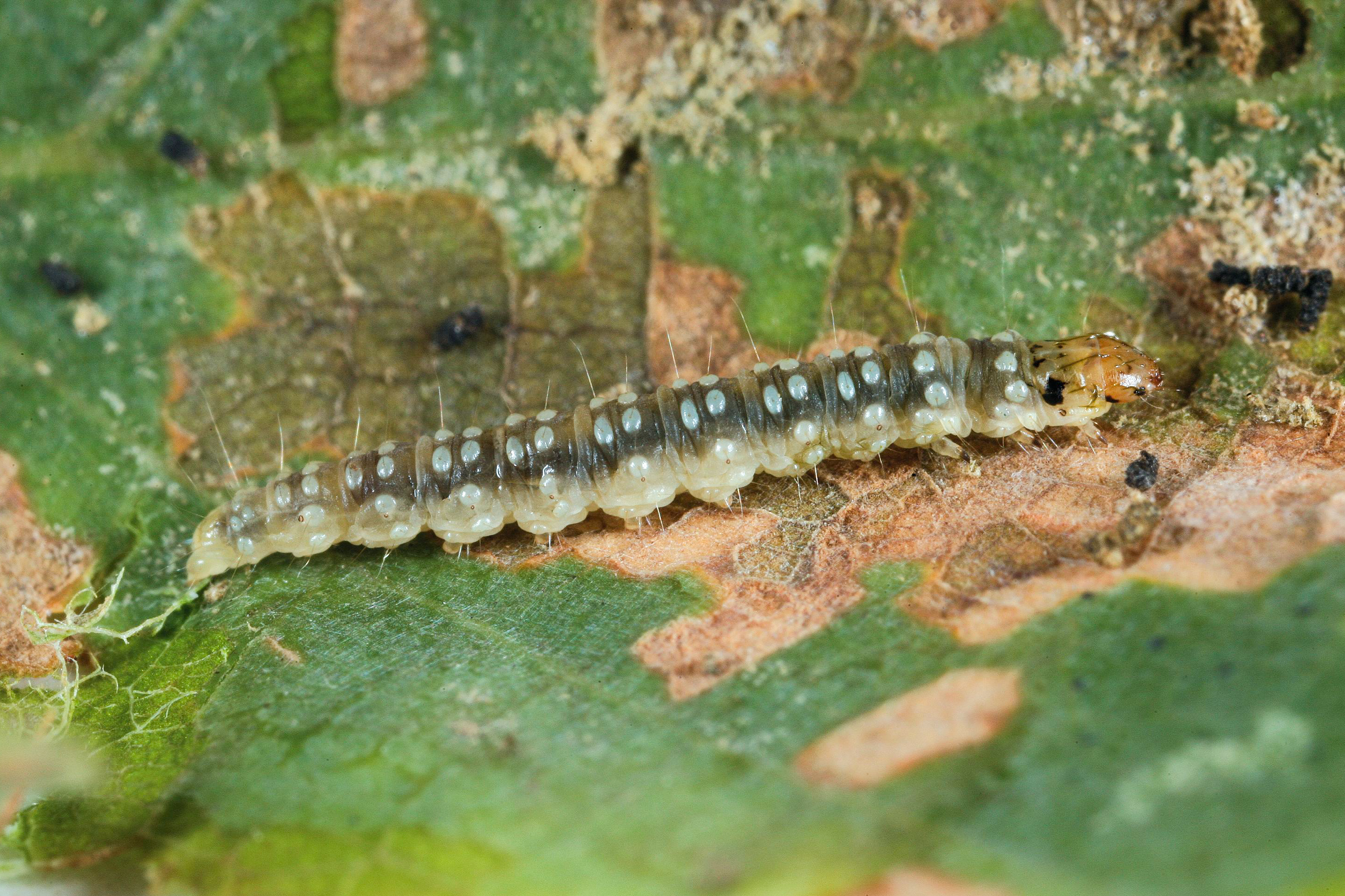
Larva

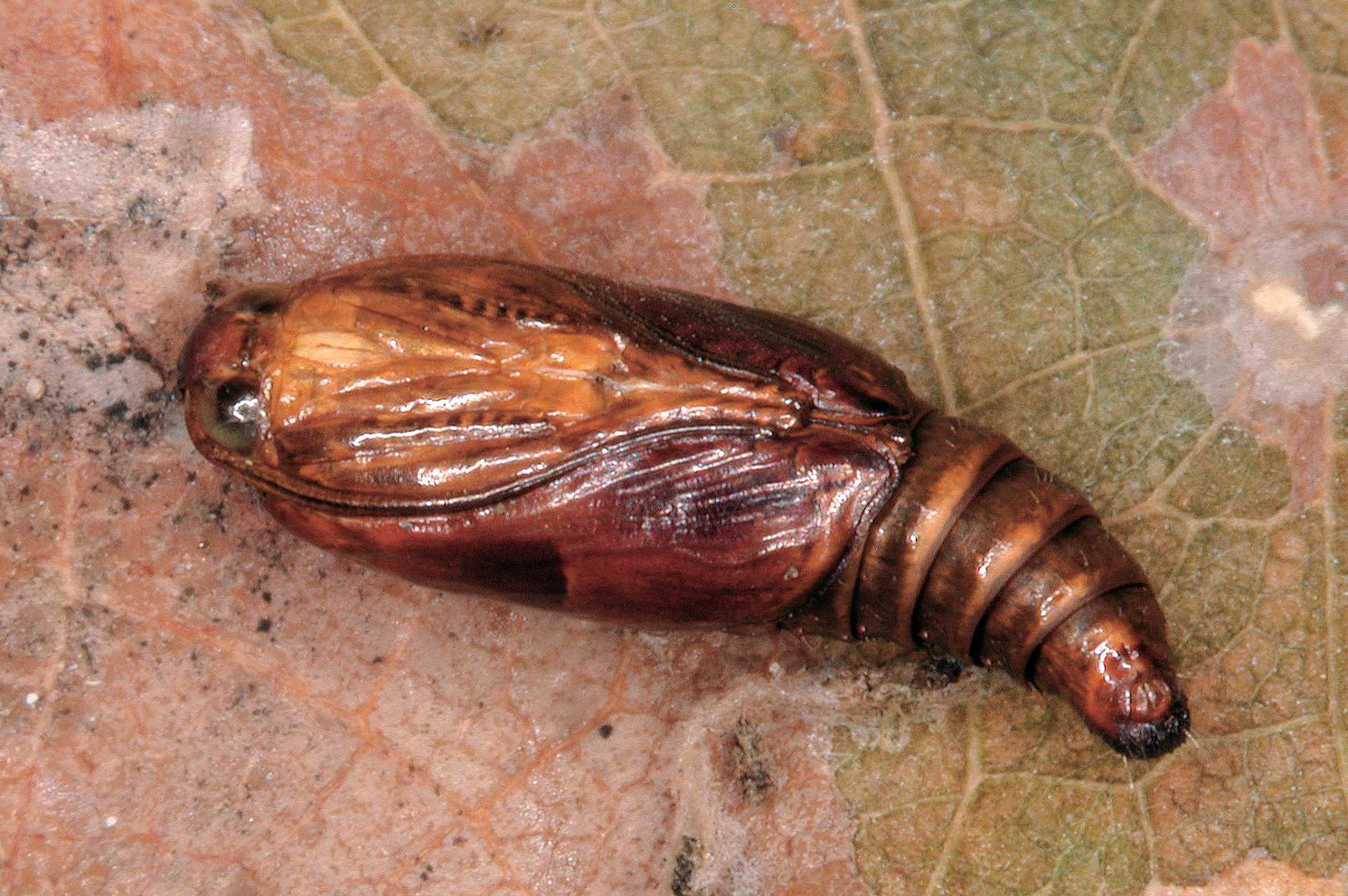
Pupa

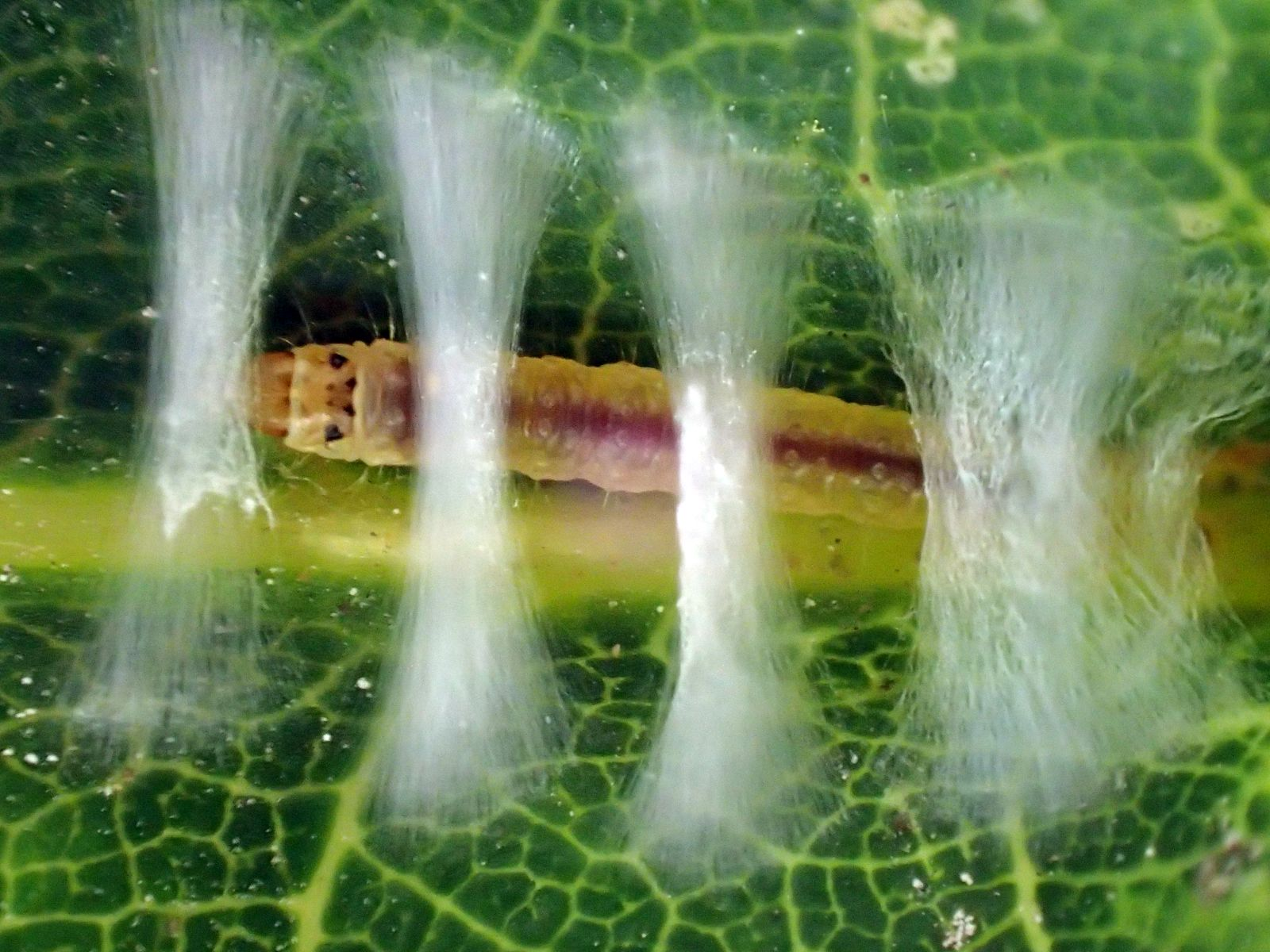
Ancylis mitterbacheriana larva spins a leaf into a pod to hide in

The wingspan is about 13–17 mm. The forewings are ferruginous. The costa is strigulated with black and posteriorly with white. There is a subquadrate dark ferruginous-brown dorsal blotch reaching from the base to the middle, posteriorly whitish-edged and a thick very oblique deep ferruginous streak from middle of costa, sometimes reaching termen beneath apex. The hindwings are rather dark grey. The larva is dull green; head and plate of 2 yellow -brownish, blackish-marked Julius von Kennel provides a full description.

Adults are on wing from May to June.

The larvae feed on Quercus, Malus and Fagus species.
