= Henry Knaggs =

Henry Knaggs may refer to:

- Henry Guard Knaggs (1832–1908), English entomologist
- Henry Valentine Knaggs (1859–1954), English doctor and author
