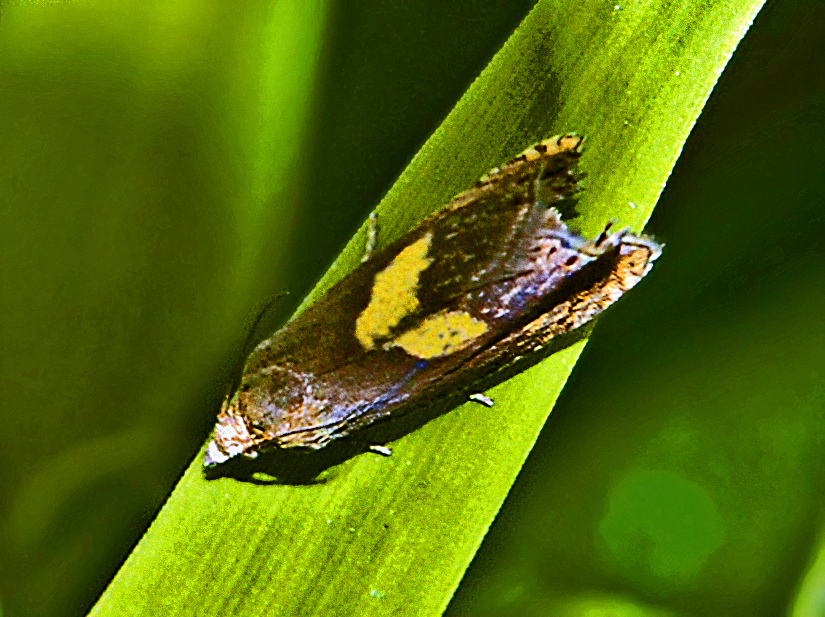

Scientific classification
- Kingdom: Animalia
- Phylum: Arthropoda
- Class: Insecta
- Order: Lepidoptera
- Family: Tortricidae
- Genus: Dichrorampha
- Species: D. vancouverana

Binomial name
- Dichrorampha vancouverana McDunnough, 1935

Synonyms
- Dichrorampha gueneeana Obraztsov, 1953; Dichrorampha politana sensu auct.

= Dichrorampha vancouverana =

Species of moth

Dichrorampha vancouverana, the tanacetum root moth, is a moth of the family Tortricidae.

== Description ==
Dichrorampha vancouverana has a wingspan 12–15 millimetres (0.47–0.59 in). These small to medium-sized moths have dark brown or dark grey-brown forewings with a large comma-shaped ochreous-orange or pale yellowish medio-dorsal blotch and some small irregular white and dark brown markings along the forewings outer edge. Hindwings are dark brown.

Similar species are Dichrorampha alpinana and Dichrorampha flavidorsana.

== Distribution and habitat ==
This species is present in most of Europe, except in the far north and in the southeast, and can also be found in the eastern Palearctic realm and in the Nearctic realm. These moths inhabit dry grassy places, rough meadows, downland and scrubs.

== Biology ==
The adults fly in June and July, during the afternoon, warm evenings and sunset. The larvae mainly feed within the roots of tansy (Tanacetum vulgare) and yarrow (Achillea millefolium).
