= Eudonia exilis =

Scientific classification
- Kingdom: Animalia
- Phylum: Arthropoda
- Class: Insecta
- Order: Lepidoptera
- Family: Crambidae
- Genus: Eudonia
- Species: E. exilis

Binomial name
- Eudonia exilis (Knaggs, 1867)

Synonyms
- Scoparia exilis Knaggs, 1867

Species of moth

Eudonia exilis is a moth in the family Crambidae. It was described by Henry Guard Knaggs in 1867. It is found in New Zealand.

The wingspan is 18–20 mm for males and about 16 mm for females. The forewings are pale greyish ochreous, irrorated (sprinkled) with white. The first line is whitish, dark-margined posteriorly. The second line is white, blackish-margined anteriorly. The hindwings are pale whitish grey, somewhat tinged with ochreous. The postmedian line and hindmargin are darker. Adults have been recorded on wing in October, December and April.
