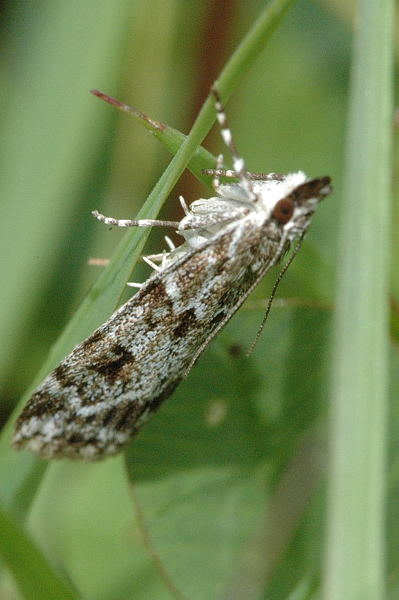

Scientific classification
- Kingdom: Animalia
- Phylum: Arthropoda
- Class: Insecta
- Order: Lepidoptera
- Family: Crambidae
- Genus: Scoparia
- Species: S. basistrigalis

Binomial name
- Scoparia basistrigalis Knaggs, 1866

Synonyms
- Scoparia ambigualis f. bifascialis Turati, 1923; Scoparia ambigualis var. signella Teich, 1889; Scoparia basistrigalis f. tweediei Leraut, 1984; Scoparia basistrigalis sosia Leraut, 1982

= Scoparia basistrigalis =

Species of moth

Scoparia basistrigalis is a species of moth of the family Crambidae. It was described by Henry Guard Knaggs in 1866 and it is found in Europe.

The wingspan is 20–23 mm. The moth flies in July depending on the location.

The larvae feed on various mosses, such as Mnium hornum.
