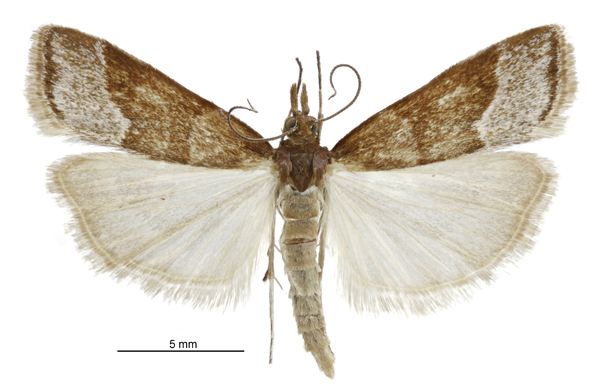
- Male
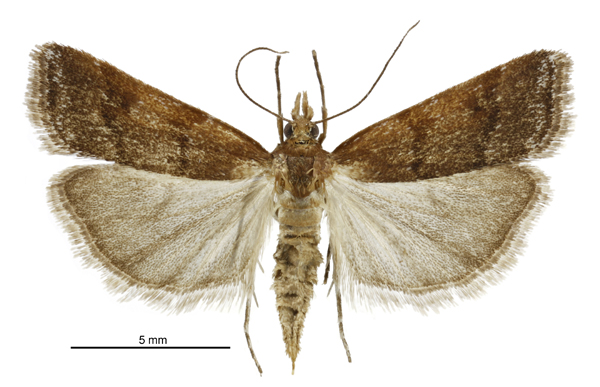
- Female

Scientific classification
- Kingdom: Animalia
- Phylum: Arthropoda
- Clade: Pancrustacea
- Class: Insecta
- Order: Lepidoptera
- Family: Crambidae
- Genus: Eudonia
- Species: E. feredayi

Binomial name
- Eudonia feredayi (Knaggs, 1867)

Synonyms
- Scoparia feredayi Knaggs, 1867; Scoparia moanalis C. Felder, R. Felder & Rogenhofer, 1875

= Eudonia feredayi =

Species of moth

Eudonia feredayi is a moth in the family Crambidae. It was described by Henry Guard Knaggs in 1867. This species is endemic to New Zealand.

The wingspan is 18–21 mm. The forewings are reddish ochreous, irrorated (sprinkled) with dark reddish brown. The first line is whitish, dark margined posteriorly. The second line is white, dark margined anteriorly. The hindwings are pale whitish grey, tinged with ochreous. The postmedian line and hindmarginal band are darker grey. Adults have been recorded on wing from January to March.

Adults are attracted to light and have been collected via a mercury vapour light trap.
