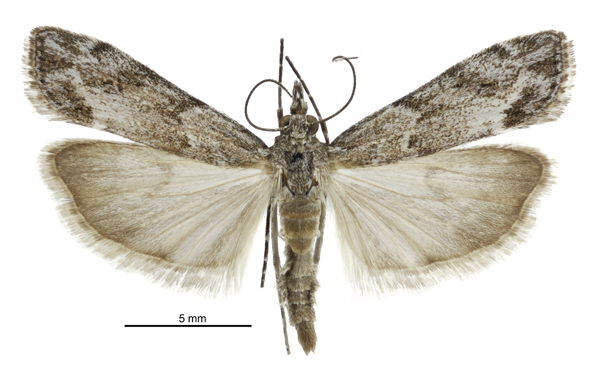
- Male

Scientific classification
- Kingdom: Animalia
- Phylum: Arthropoda
- Class: Insecta
- Order: Lepidoptera
- Family: Crambidae
- Genus: Eudonia
- Species: E. rakaiensis

Binomial name
- Eudonia rakaiensis (Knaggs, 1867)

Synonyms
- Scoparia rakaiensis Knaggs, 1867; Eudonia rakaiaensis (Knaggs, 1867)

= Eudonia rakaiensis =

Species of moth

Eudonia rakaiensis is a moth in the family Crambidae. It is endemic to New Zealand.

== Taxonomy ==
This species was described by Henry Guard Knaggs in 1867 and named Scoparia rakaiensis. John S. Dugdale assigned this species to the genus Eudonia in 1988. However he misspelt the specific epithet as rakaiaensis instead of the correct rakaiensis.
