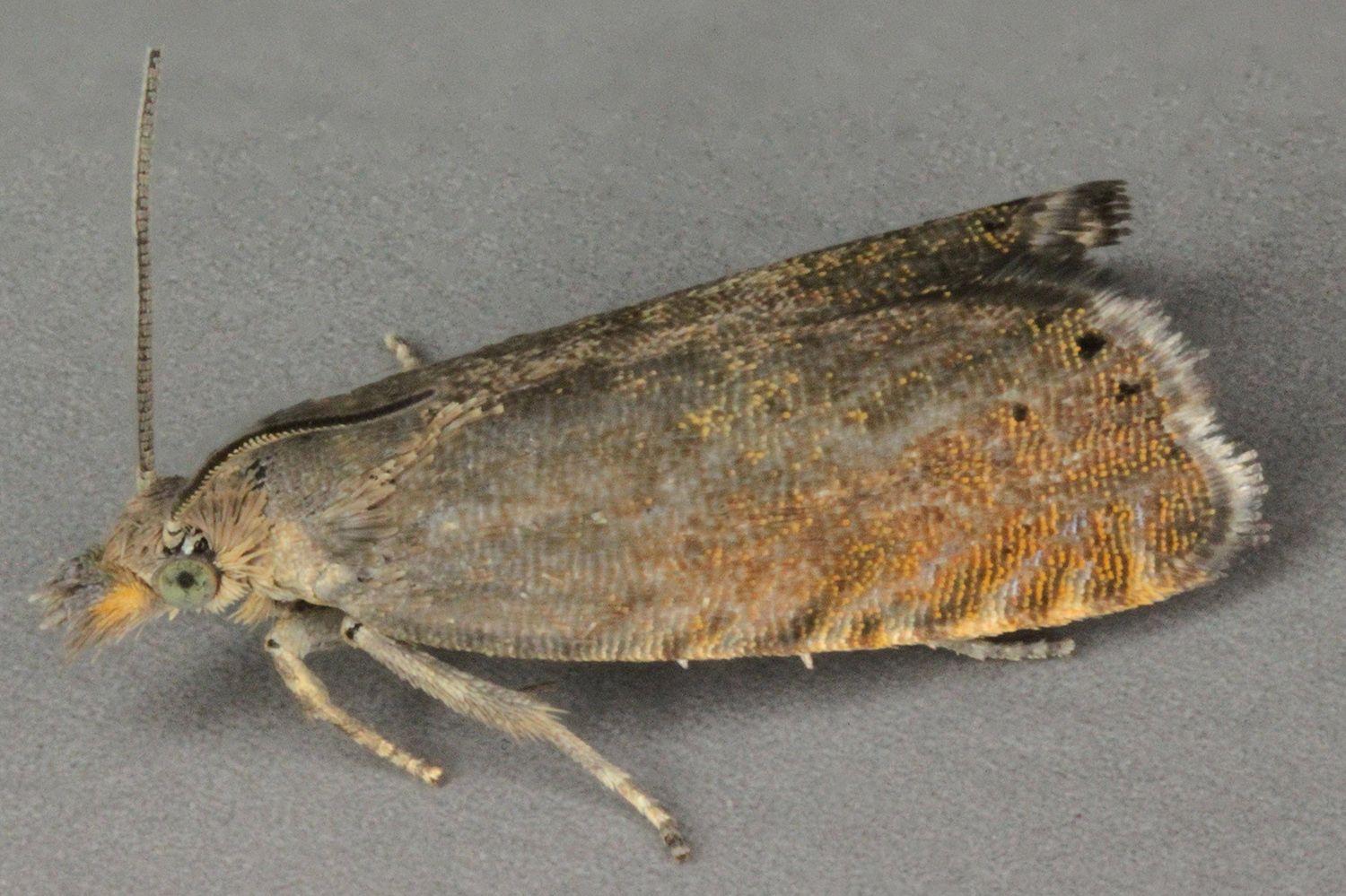

Scientific classification
- Domain: Eukaryota
- Kingdom: Animalia
- Phylum: Arthropoda
- Class: Insecta
- Order: Lepidoptera
- Family: Tortricidae
- Genus: Dichrorampha
- Species: D. aeratana

Binomial name
- Dichrorampha aeratana (Pierce & Metcalfe, 1915)

= Dichrorampha aeratana =

Species of moth

Dichrorampha aeratana is a moth belonging to the family Tortricidae. The species was first described by Pierce and Metcalfe in 1915.

It is native to Europe, the Palearctic and Northern America. rance The wingspan is 11–16 mm. The species is quite difficult to distinguish from Dichrorampha plumbana by external appearance, one must examine the genitalia to determine these species with certainty. This species has 3-5 narrow, silver-grey slashes along the front edge of the forewings, and some black spots along the outer edge that are drawn out to short longitudinal marks, while those in related species are often rounder. The hindwings are brown, not markedly lighter than the forewing.

The larvae live in the rhizomes of Leucanthemum vulgare. The adults wraps in May–June
