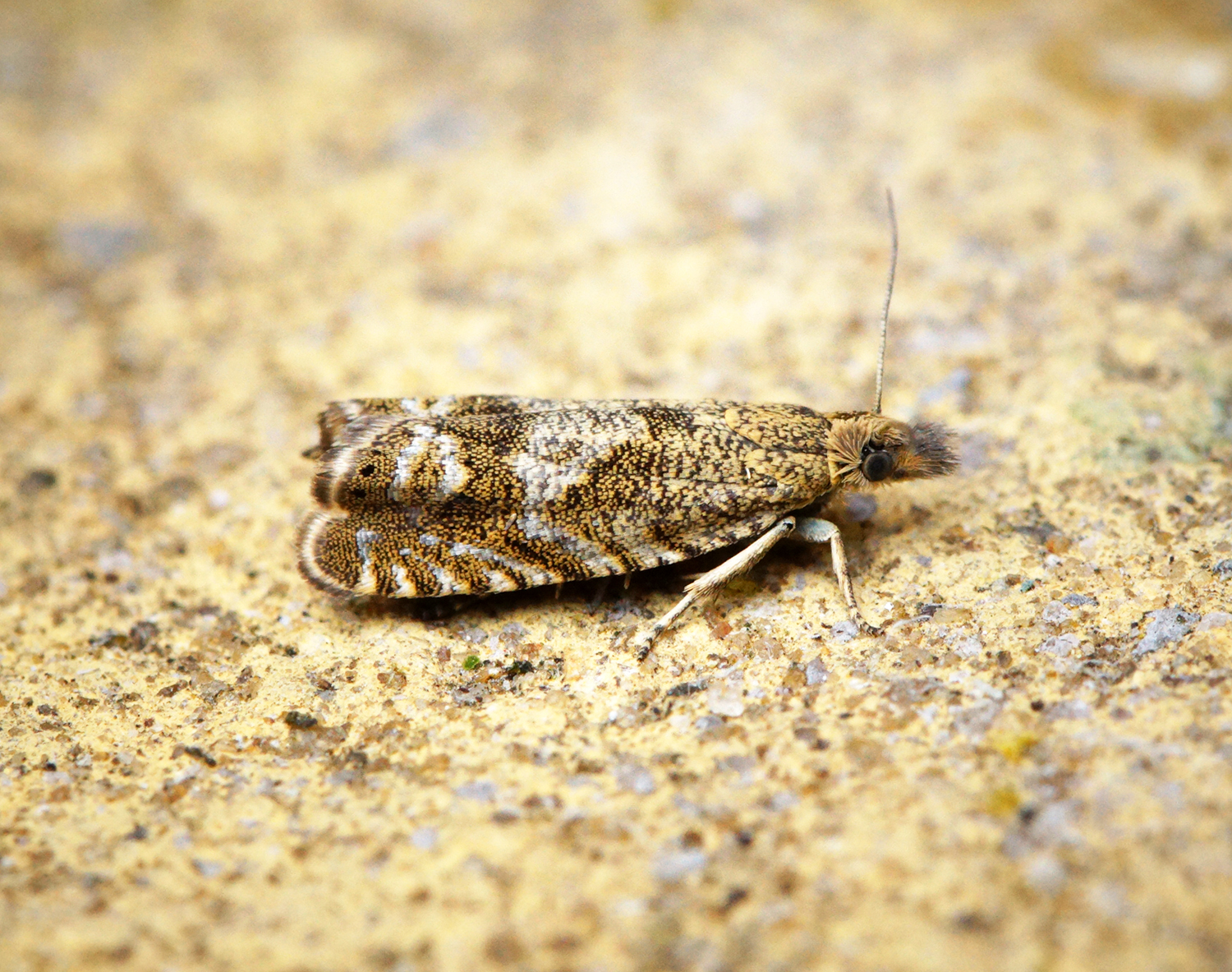

Scientific classification
- Domain: Eukaryota
- Kingdom: Animalia
- Phylum: Arthropoda
- Class: Insecta
- Order: Lepidoptera
- Family: Tortricidae
- Genus: Dichrorampha
- Species: D. plumbagana

Binomial name
- Dichrorampha plumbagana (Treitschke, 1830)

= Dichrorampha plumbagana =

Species of moth

Dichrorampha plumbagana is a moth belonging to the family Tortricidae first described by Georg Friedrich Treitschke in 1830.

It is native to Europe.

The wingspan is 12-14mm. The forewing fold reaches 2/5. The ground colour is dark fuscous, sharply irrorated with pale ochreous, slightly greenish-tinged. The costa is posteriorly strigulated with silvery-whitish. Some streaks from costa posteriorly and margins of ocellus are bright silvery-leaden-metallic. There is an obscure leaden metallic dorsal blotch with a darker central streak, narrowed upwards, contracted beneath a truncate apex and three black dots on the termen towards middle. The termen is oblique, the sinuation distinct. The hindwings are grey, paler towards base. The larva is yellowish-white; head light brown; plate of 2 very pale brown.

The larvae develop on the roots and the lower part of the stem of yarrow Achillea millefolium. The adults fly in June.
