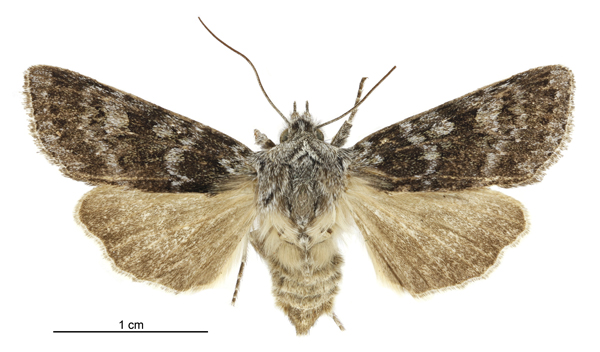
- Female
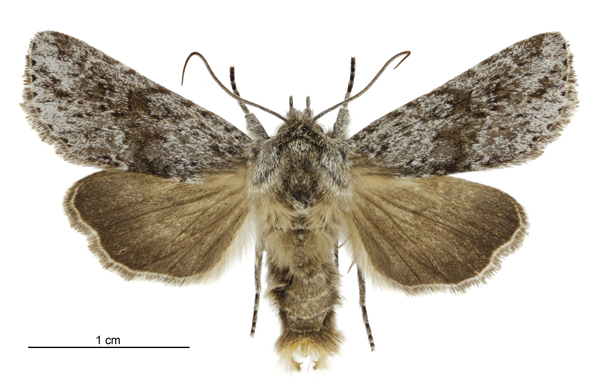
- Male

Scientific classification
- Kingdom: Animalia
- Phylum: Arthropoda
- Clade: Pancrustacea
- Class: Insecta
- Order: Lepidoptera
- Superfamily: Noctuoidea
- Family: Noctuidae
- Genus: Physetica
- Species: P. cucullina

Binomial name
- Physetica cucullina (Guenée, 1868)

Synonyms
- Xylocampa cucullina Guenée, 1868; Melanchra cucullina (Guenée, 1868); Aletia cucullina (Guenée, 1868); Aletia obsecrata Meyrick, 1914; Aletia parmata Philpott, 1926; Aletia probenota Howes, 1945

= Physetica cucullina =

Species of moth endemic to New Zealand

Physetica cucullina is a species of moth of the family Noctuidae. It is endemic to New Zealand and can be found throughout the South Island, apart from in the Nelson district with the exception of the St Arnaud Range where it is present. It is likely to be also resident in Stewart Island. P. cucullina lives in shrubland at subalpine and alpine zones but can occur at sea-level in the more southern regions. The life history of this species is poorly documented. There is only one known record in the New Zealand Arthropod Collection of the larvae of this species having been reared. These larvae were reared on Leucopogon fraseri. Adults of this species is on the wing from October to March and are attracted to light. P. cucullina is almost identical in appearance to P. funerea. The only reliable distinguishing feature between the two species is the antennae of the male. P. cucullina is also very similar in appearance to P. sequens but P. sequens lacks the narrow black line on the forewing dorsum area that can be present on the forewings of P. cucullina.

== Taxonomy ==
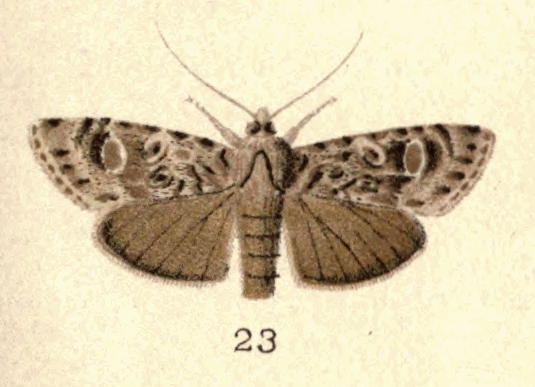
P. cucullina as illustrated by Hudson

This species was first described by Achille Guenée in 1868 and named Xylocampa cucullina. In 1898 George Hudson described and illustrated this species under the names Melanchra cucullina. Edward Meyrick, in 1912, placed this specie in the Aletia genus. Hudson again discussed this species in 1928 but under the name Aletia cucullina following Meyrick's placement. In 1988 J. S. Dugdale placed this species in the Aletia genus. In 2017 Robert Hoare undertook a review of New Zealand Noctuinae and placed this species in the genus Physetica. Hoare also synonymised Aletia obsecrata and Aletia probenota with P. cucullina and reinstated the synonymy of Aletia parmata with P. cucullina. The male holotype specimen was collected by H. G. Knaggs, likely at Rakaia in Canterbury and is held at the Natural History Museum, London.

== Description ==
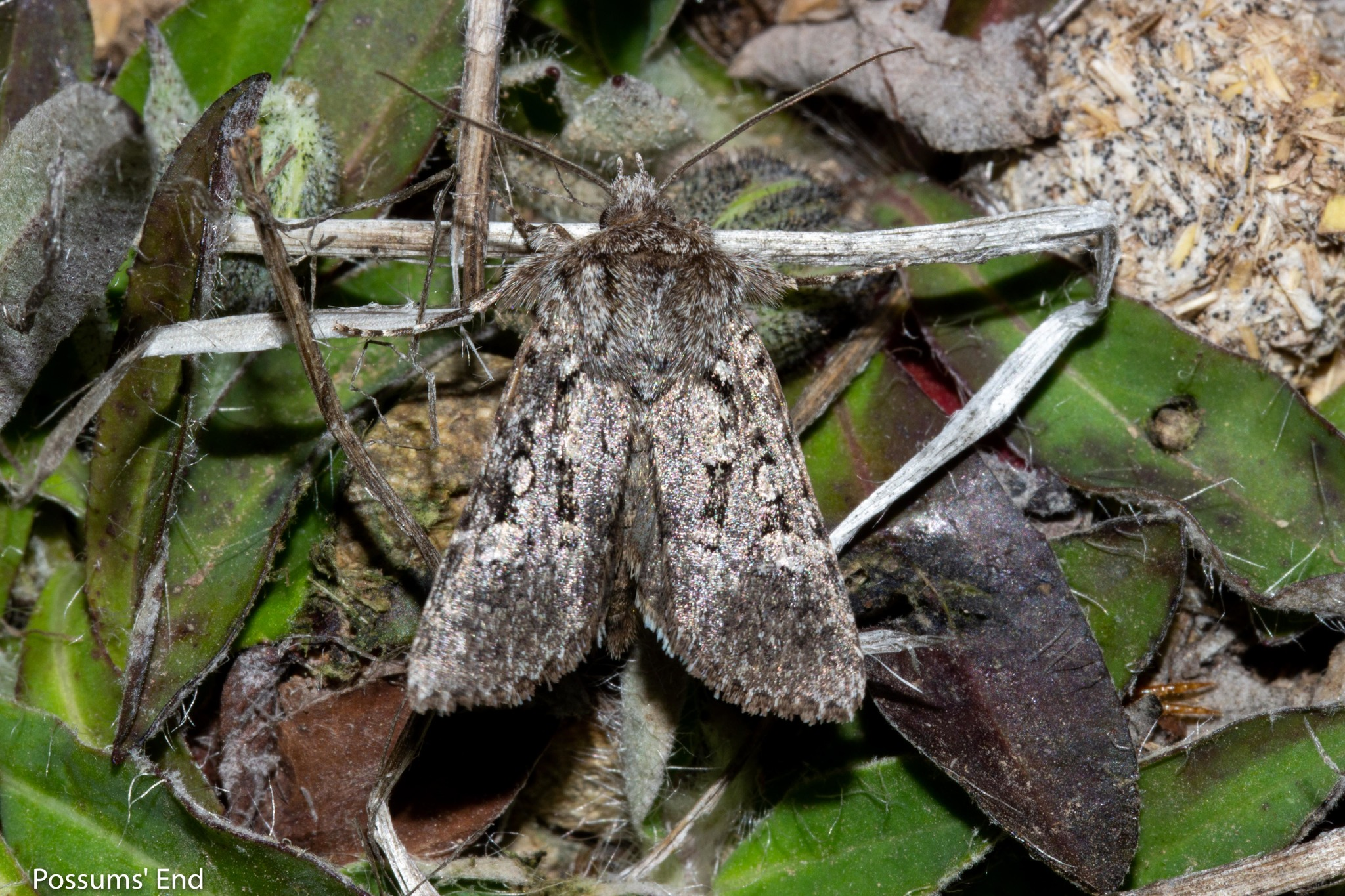
Observation of P. cucullina

Guenée first described the species as follows:

It is scarcely the size of inceptura, and the wings are rather more obtuse. Superior cinereous, with intensely black terminal clots; the costa also marked with black dots, which indicate the origin of the ordinary lines, which are little visible; the half-line is the most apparent, formed of two arcs, one placed above the other; no basal line; subterminal indicated by a series of wedge-shaped blackish spots; and the central shade by a black dot on the inner margin; the two ordinary spots are visible, and of the normal form : inferior smoky-grey, without markings, and with a white fringe; their under-side whitish, with a large black cellular lunule, and a strongly defined border, which resembles that of the species of Anarta. Antennae stout, scarcely ciliated. The terminal joint of the palpi strongly projecting, but much shorter than the second, naked, and somewhat club-shaped. Thorax with a black line on each patagium.

The male of this species has a wingspan of between 29 and 37 mm and the female has a wingspan of between 29 and 36 mm. This species has variable colouration of its forewings. P. cucullina is almost identical in appearance to P. funerea. The only reliable distinguishing feature between the two species is the antennae of the male. Male P. cucullina have antennae with distinct erect ciliations. The only other difference is that largest specimens of P. funerea have a greater wingspan than the largest known P. cucullina. P. sequens is also similar in appearance to P. cucullina however the forewing dorsum area of the former species does not have the narrow black line that is frequently present on P. cucullina forewings.

== Distribution ==
It is endemic to New Zealand. This species is found throughout the South Island apart from in the Nelson district with the exception of the St Arnaud Range where it is present. It is likely to be also resident in Stewart Island.

== Habitat ==
P. cucullina lives in shrubland at subalpine and alpine zones but can occur at sea-level in the more southern regions.

== Behaviour ==
Adults of this species is on the wing from October to March and are attracted to light. They have been collected via a mercury vapour light trap.

== Life history and host species ==
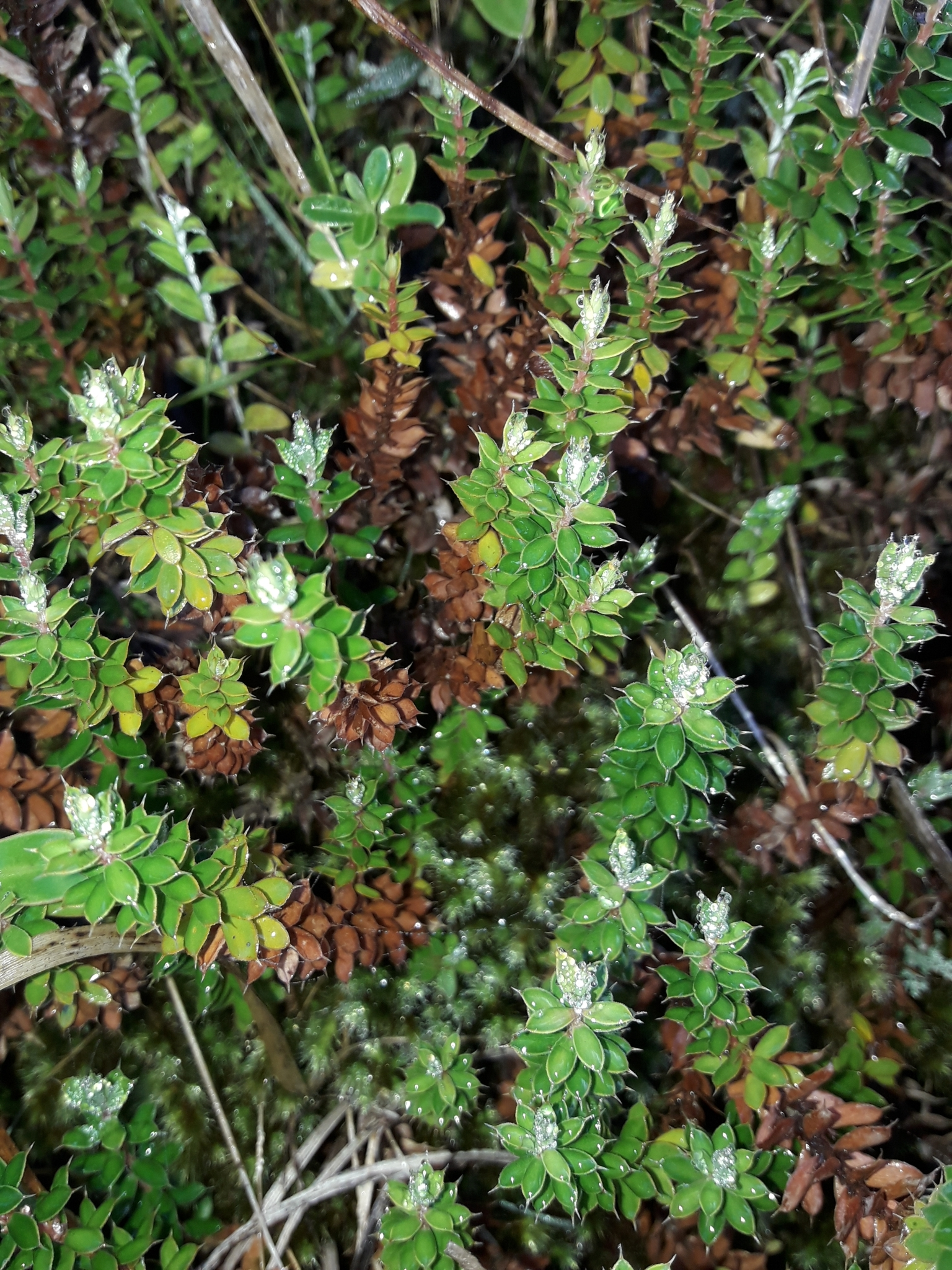
Leucopogon fraseri, species upon which P. cucullina were reared

The life history of this species is poorly documented. As at 2017, there is no description of the larvae and there is only one known record in the New Zealand Arthropod Collection of the larvae of this species having been reared. This record indicates the larvae were reared on Leucopogon fraseri.
