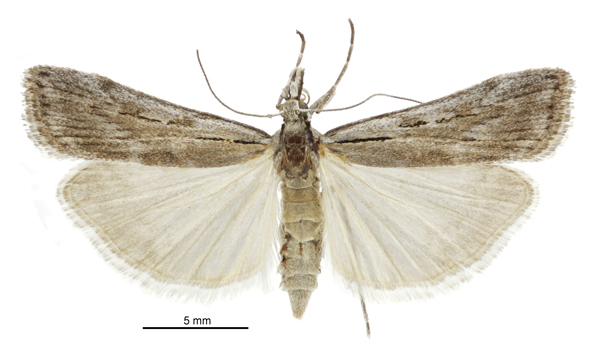
- Female

Scientific classification
- Kingdom: Animalia
- Phylum: Arthropoda
- Class: Insecta
- Order: Lepidoptera
- Family: Crambidae
- Genus: Scoparia
- Species: S. ejuncida

Binomial name
- Scoparia ejuncida Knaggs, 1867

Synonyms
- Xeroscopa ejuncida (Knaggs, 1867)

= Scoparia ejuncida =

Species of moth

Scoparia ejuncida is a moth of the family Crambidae. It was described by Henry Guard Knaggs in 1867. It is endemic to New Zealand.

The wingspan is 19–24 mm. The forewings are grey, irrorated with white. There is a fine black median line from the base to the first line. This first line is very obscure. The second line is distinct and the subterminal line is cloudy. The hindwings are pale whitish-grey, somewhat tinged with ochreous. Adults have been recorded on wing from December to March.
