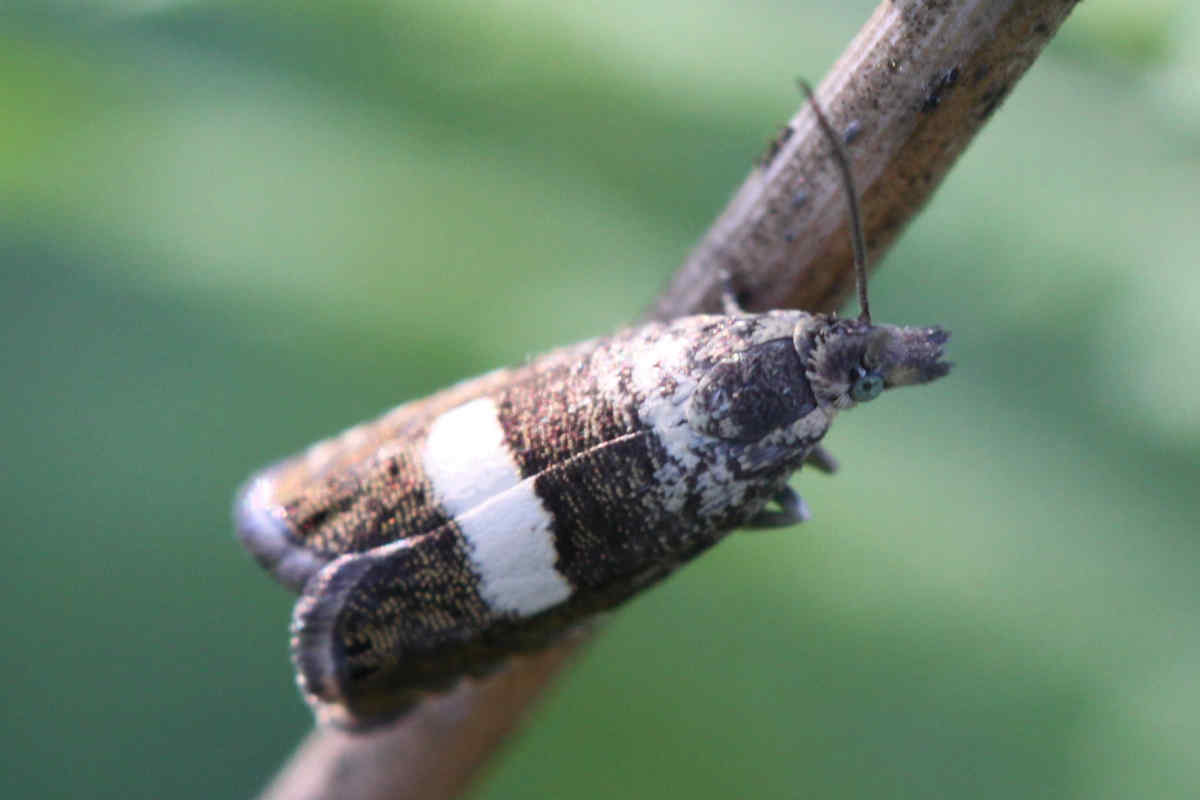

Scientific classification
- Kingdom: Animalia
- Phylum: Arthropoda
- Clade: Pancrustacea
- Class: Insecta
- Order: Lepidoptera
- Family: Tortricidae
- Genus: Dichrorampha
- Species: D. sequana

Binomial name
- Dichrorampha sequana (Hübner, 1799)

= Dichrorampha sequana =

Species of moth

Dichrorampha sequana is a species of moth belonging to the family Tortricidae.

Synonym:

- Tortrix sequana Hübner, 1799 (= basionym)
