= Dichrorampha cinerascens =

Scientific classification
- Domain: Eukaryota
- Kingdom: Animalia
- Phylum: Arthropoda
- Class: Insecta
- Order: Lepidoptera
- Family: Tortricidae
- Genus: Dichrorampha
- Species: D. cinerascens

Binomial name
- Dichrorampha cinerascens (Danilevsky, 1948)

Species of moth

Dichrorampha cinerascens is a moth belonging to the family Tortricidae first described by Aleksandr Sergeievich Danilevsky in 1948.

It is native to Northern Europe.
