= Dichrorampha agilana =

Scientific classification
- Kingdom: Animalia
- Phylum: Arthropoda
- Class: Insecta
- Order: Lepidoptera
- Family: Tortricidae
- Genus: Dichrorampha
- Species: D. agilana

Binomial name
- Dichrorampha agilana (Tengström, 1848)

Species of moth

Dichrorampha agilana is a moth belonging to the family Tortricidae first described by Johan Martin Jakob von Tengström in 1848.

Dichrorampha agilana belongs to the genus Dichrorampha, and the family Tortricidae.

It is native to Europe.
