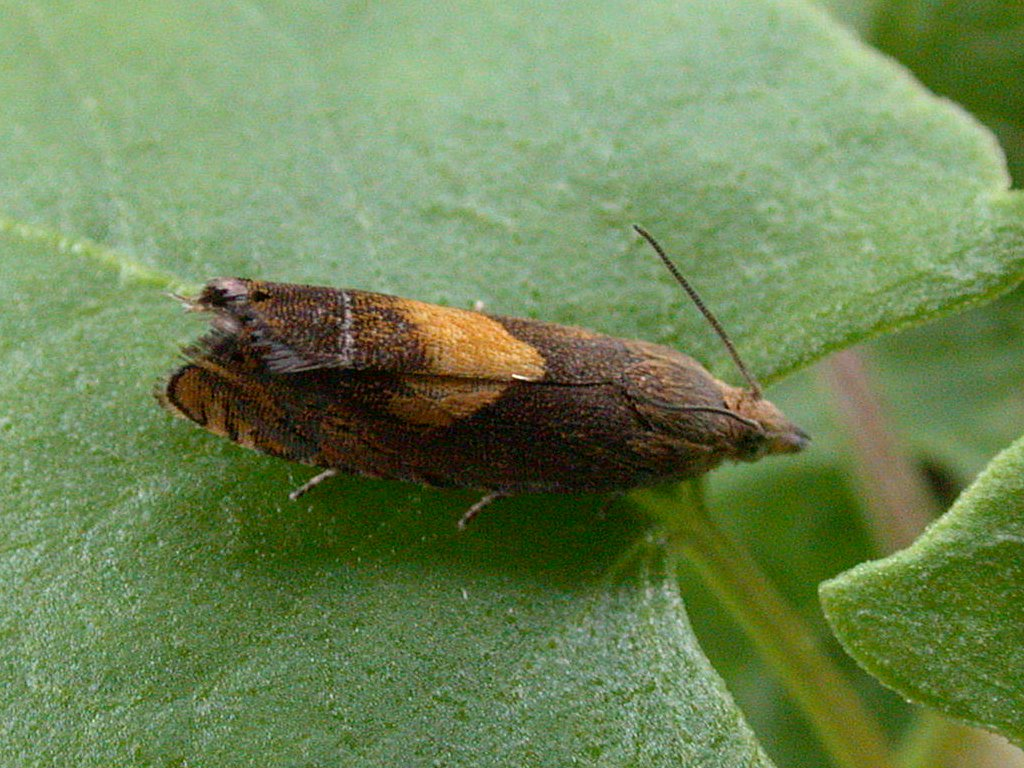

Scientific classification
- Kingdom: Animalia
- Phylum: Arthropoda
- Clade: Pancrustacea
- Class: Insecta
- Order: Lepidoptera
- Family: Tortricidae
- Genus: Dichrorampha
- Species: D. petiverella

Binomial name
- Dichrorampha petiverella (Linnaeus, 1758)

= Dichrorampha petiverella =

Species of moth

Dichrorampha petiverella is a moth of the family Tortricidae. It is found in the Palearctic realm.

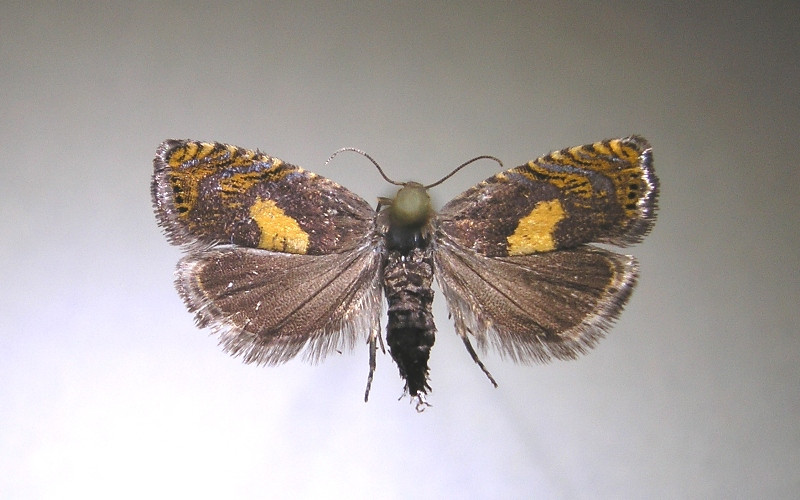
Mounted

The wingspan is 10–13 mm. The forewings are dark fuscous, posteriorly irrorated with pale orange ochreous. The costa is posteriorly strigulated with whitish. There is a sharply marked whitish -yellowish rather narrow curved transverse median dorsal blotch and two dark leaden-metallic oblique streaks from the costa posteriorly. There are three or four black dots on the termen towards middle, and a whitish subapical dash. The hindwings are dark fuscous, lighter basally. The larva is pinkish-white; head yellowish-brown; plate of 2 brownish-tinged :

The moth flies from April to August..

The larvae feed on Achillea millefolium and tansy.

== Notes ==
1. The flight season refers to Belgium and the Netherlands. This may vary in other parts of the range.
