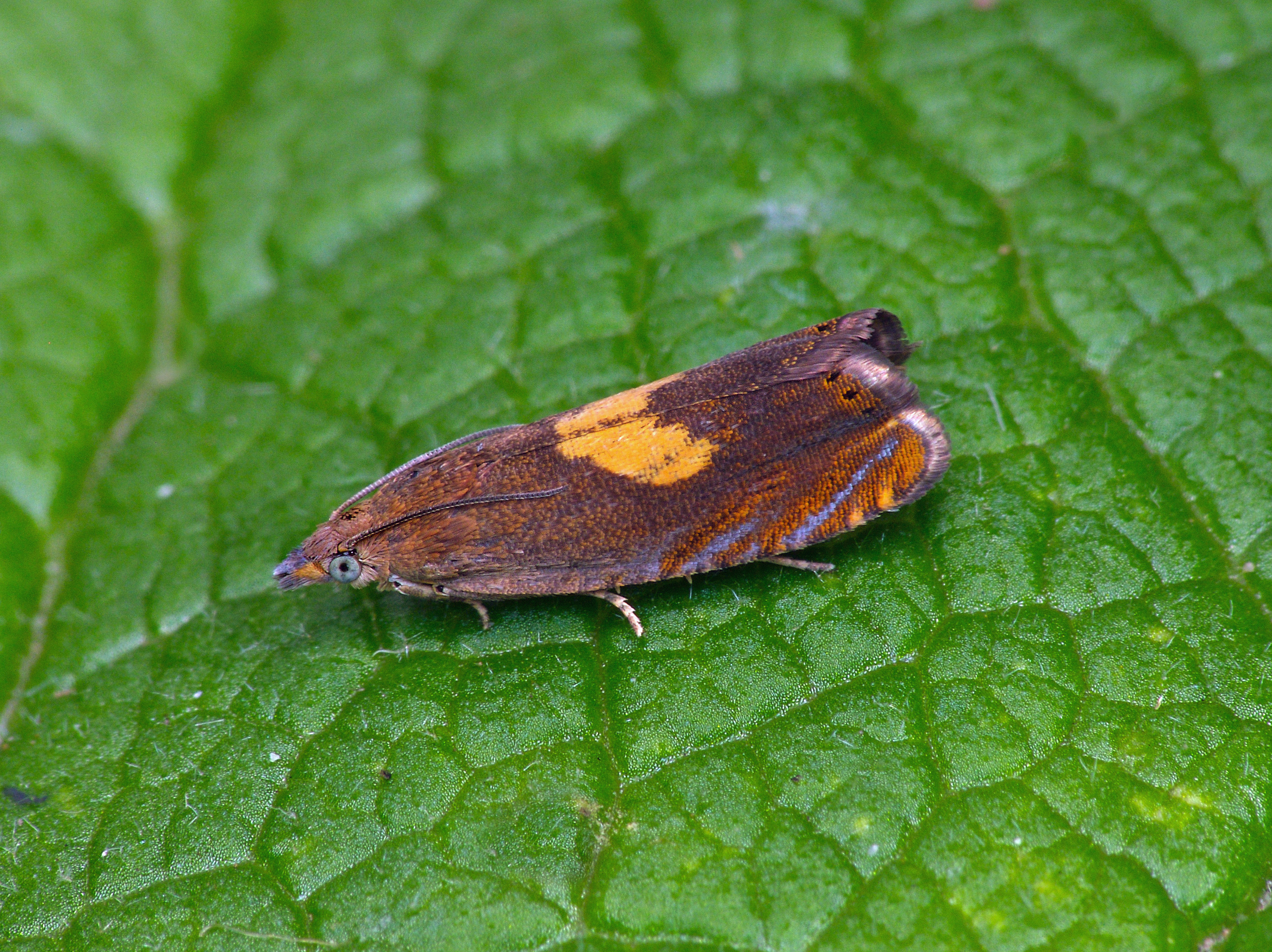

Scientific classification
- Domain: Eukaryota
- Kingdom: Animalia
- Phylum: Arthropoda
- Class: Insecta
- Order: Lepidoptera
- Family: Tortricidae
- Genus: Dichrorampha
- Species: D. flavidorsana

Binomial name
- Dichrorampha flavidorsana Knaggs, 1867

= Dichrorampha flavidorsana =

Species of moth

Dichrorampha flavidorsana is a moth belonging to the family Tortricidae subfamily Olethreutinae Tribe Grapholitini first described by Henry Guard Knaggs in 1867.

It is native to Europe.
