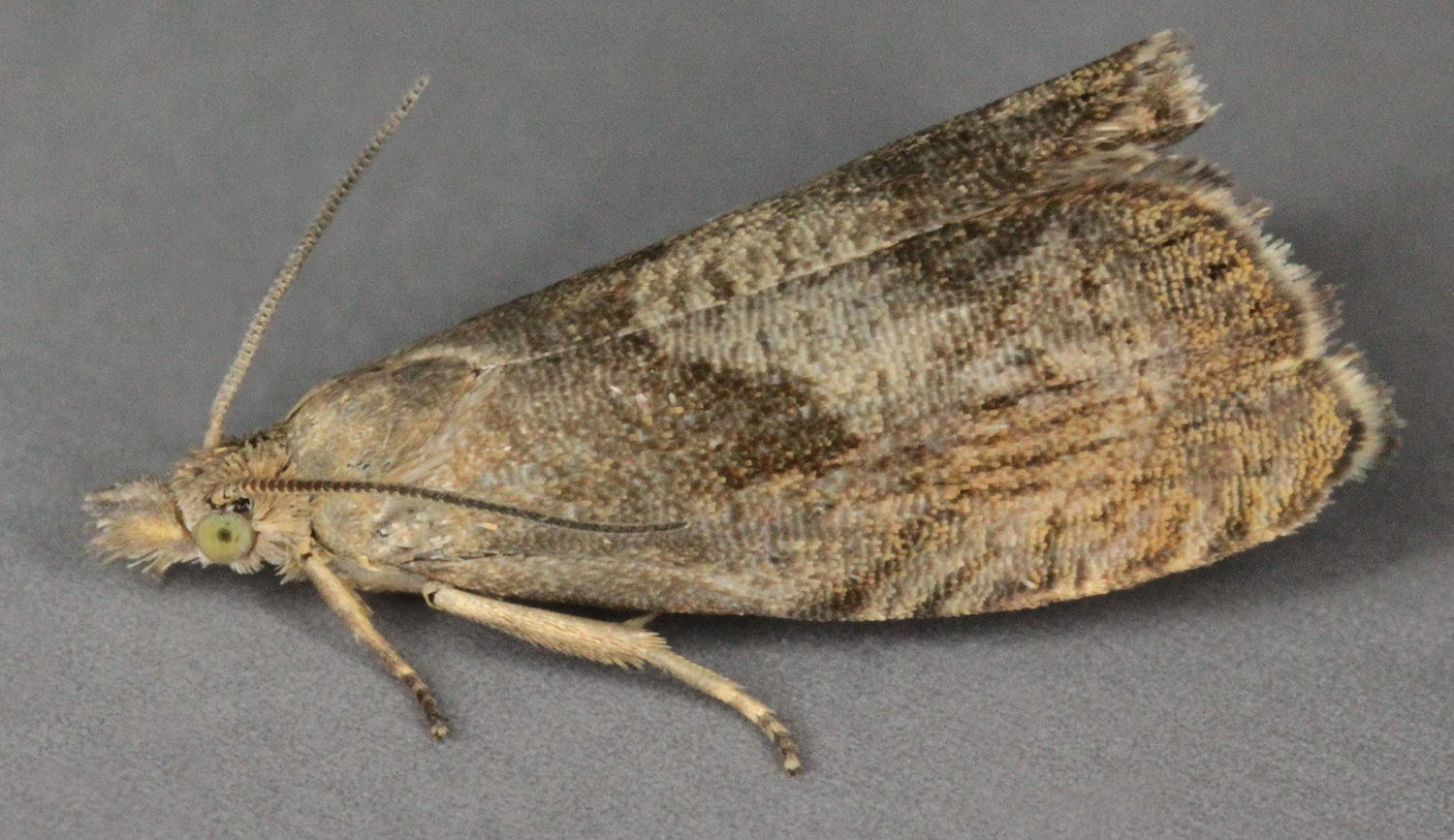

Scientific classification
- Kingdom: Animalia
- Phylum: Arthropoda
- Clade: Pancrustacea
- Class: Insecta
- Order: Lepidoptera
- Family: Tortricidae
- Genus: Dichrorampha
- Species: D. simpliciana

Binomial name
- Dichrorampha simpliciana Haworth, 1811

= Dichrorampha simpliciana =

Species of moth

Dichrorampha simpliciana is a moth of the family Tortricidae. It is found in Europe and the Near East.

The wingspan is 12–16 mm. The forewings are considerably dilated posteriorly and the fold reaches 2/5. The ground colour is dark fuscous, irrorated with pale ochreous. The costa is posteriorly obscurely streaked with dull purplish-metallic. There is a paler triangular straight edged median dorsal blotch, darker-margined anteriorly and three minute indistinct black dots on the termen towards middle, and sometimes a whitish subapical dash. The termen is rounded, little oblique, sinuation well-marked. The hindwings are fuscous, darker posteriorly. The larva is dull whitish; head light brown; plate of 2 faintly brownish

The moth flies from May to September..

The larvae feed on Artemisia vulgaris.

== Notes ==
1. The flight season refers to Belgium and the Netherlands. This may vary in other parts of the range.
