= Dichrorampha sylvicolana =

Scientific classification
- Kingdom: Animalia
- Phylum: Arthropoda
- Clade: Pancrustacea
- Class: Insecta
- Order: Lepidoptera
- Family: Tortricidae
- Genus: Dichrorampha
- Species: D. sylvicolana

Binomial name
- Dichrorampha sylvicolana Heinemann, 1863

Species of moth

Dichrorampha sylvicolana is a moth belonging to the family Tortricidae. The species was first described by Hermann von Heinemann in 1863.

== Distribution ==
D. sylvicolana is native to Europe.
