= Dichrorampha teichiana =

Scientific classification
- Domain: Eukaryota
- Kingdom: Animalia
- Phylum: Arthropoda
- Class: Insecta
- Order: Lepidoptera
- Family: Tortricidae
- Genus: Dichrorampha
- Species: D. teichiana

Binomial name
- Dichrorampha teichiana Šulcs & Kerppola, 1997

Species of butterfly

Dichrorampha teichiana is a butterfly belonging to the family Tortricidae. The species was first described by Ivars Šulcs and Sakari Kerppola in 1997.
