= Dichrorampha obscuratana =

Scientific classification
- Kingdom: Animalia
- Phylum: Arthropoda
- Class: Insecta
- Order: Lepidoptera
- Family: Tortricidae
- Genus: Dichrorampha
- Species: D. obscuratana

Binomial name
- Dichrorampha obscuratana (Wolff, 1955)

Species of moth

Dichrorampha obscuratana is a moth belonging to the family Tortricidae first described by Wolff in 1955.

It is native to Europe.
