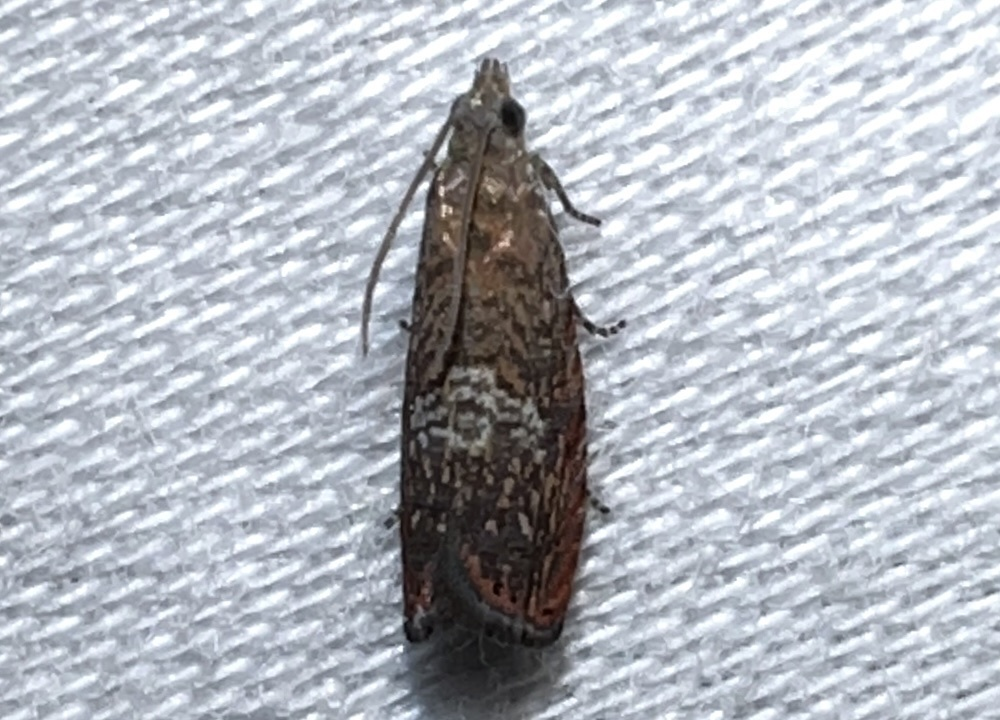

Scientific classification
- Kingdom: Animalia
- Phylum: Arthropoda
- Clade: Pancrustacea
- Class: Insecta
- Order: Lepidoptera
- Family: Tortricidae
- Genus: Dichrorampha
- Species: D. sapodilla

Binomial name
- Dichrorampha sapodilla Heppner, 1981

= Dichrorampha sapodilla =

Species of moth

Dichrorampha sapodilla is a moth in the family Tortricidae. Described by John B. Heppner in 1981. It is found in Florida.
