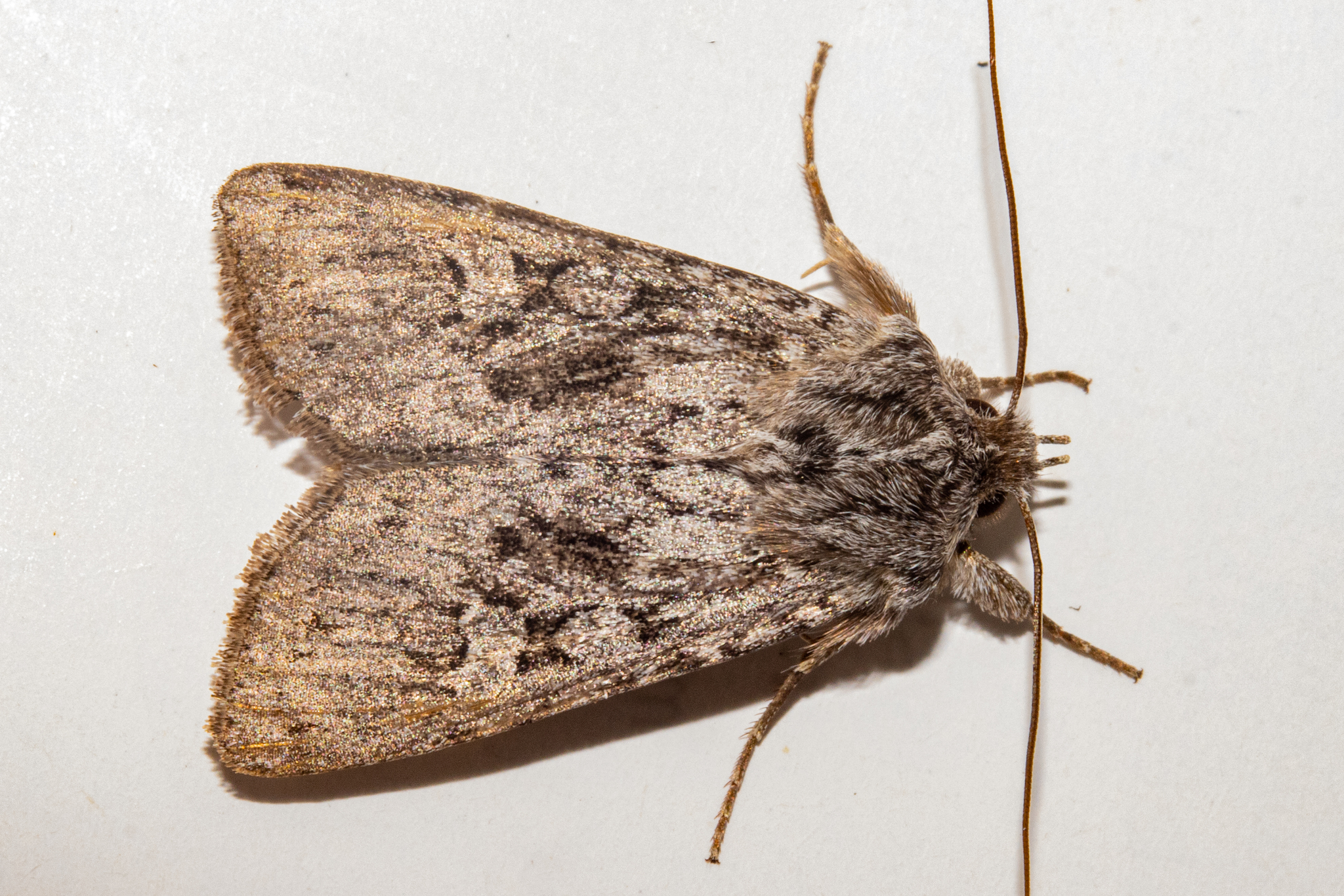
- Physetica funerea found in Kahurangi National Park

Scientific classification
- Kingdom: Animalia
- Phylum: Arthropoda
- Class: Insecta
- Order: Lepidoptera
- Superfamily: Noctuoidea
- Family: Noctuidae
- Genus: Physetica
- Species: P. funerea

Binomial name
- Physetica funerea (Philpott, 1927)

Synonyms
- Aletia funerea Philpott, 1927

= Physetica funerea =

Species of moth endemic to New Zealand

Physetica funerea is a species of moth of the family Noctuidae. It is endemic to New Zealand and is found only in the western and central parts of the South Island. This species inhabits shrubland in the subalpine and alpine zones. The life history of this species is unknown as are the larval host species. Adults of this species are on the wing from October to February. This species is almost identical to P. cucullina with the only difference between the two species being the structure of the male antennae. P. funerea is also similar in appearance to P. sequens, but the latter species tends to have a prominently underlined kidney-shaped mark nearer to the outer edge of the forewing.

== Taxonomy ==
This species was first described by Alfred Philpott in 1927 and named Aletia funerea. In 1928 George Hudson synonymised this name with the species now known as Physetica cucullina. In 2017 Robert Hoare undertook a review of New Zealand Noctuinae and reinstated this species in the genus Physetica. The female holotype specimen was collected at Mount Arthur tableland by Philpott and is held at the New Zealand Arthropod Collection.

== Description ==
Philpott originally described this species as follows:

♀ 37 mm. Head grey with a broad blackish longitudinal stripe on each side of median pale line. Palpi grey, third segment thin, moderately long and very slightly swollen towards apex. Antennae brown, mixed with grey on basal half. Thorax grey with a A-shaped fuscous mark. Abdomen pale fuscous. Legs fuscous grey, tarsi annulated with blackish. Forewings, costa almost straight, apex rectangular, termen very little oblique, rounded beneath; whitish-grey; markings black or blackish-fuscous; an interrupted double angled line near base; a similar line at ¼, connecting with median band in disc; a broad median band (its posterior margin indistinctly serrate) enclosing orbicular; orbicular well-defined, grey, suboval; reniform rather small but of normal shape; a subterminal band, broadly interrupted above and below middle; a series of semicircular dots round termen: fringes greyish-brown with some white scales. Hindwings fuscous: fringes fuscous, apical half white. The form of the palpi shows this species to be allied to the longstaffi group, but it is a larger and more definitely marked insect.

The wingspan of the adult male is between 32 and 41 mm whereas the female is between 38 and 40 mm. This species is almost identical to P. cucullina with the only difference between the two species being the male antenna. The male antennae of P. funerea have indistinct appressed ciliations where as P. cucullina have distinct erect ciliation. P. funerea can appear similar to specimens of P. sequens, but the later species tends to have a prominently underlined kidney-shaped mark nearer to the outer edge of the forewing, in contrast to P. sequens.

== Distribution ==
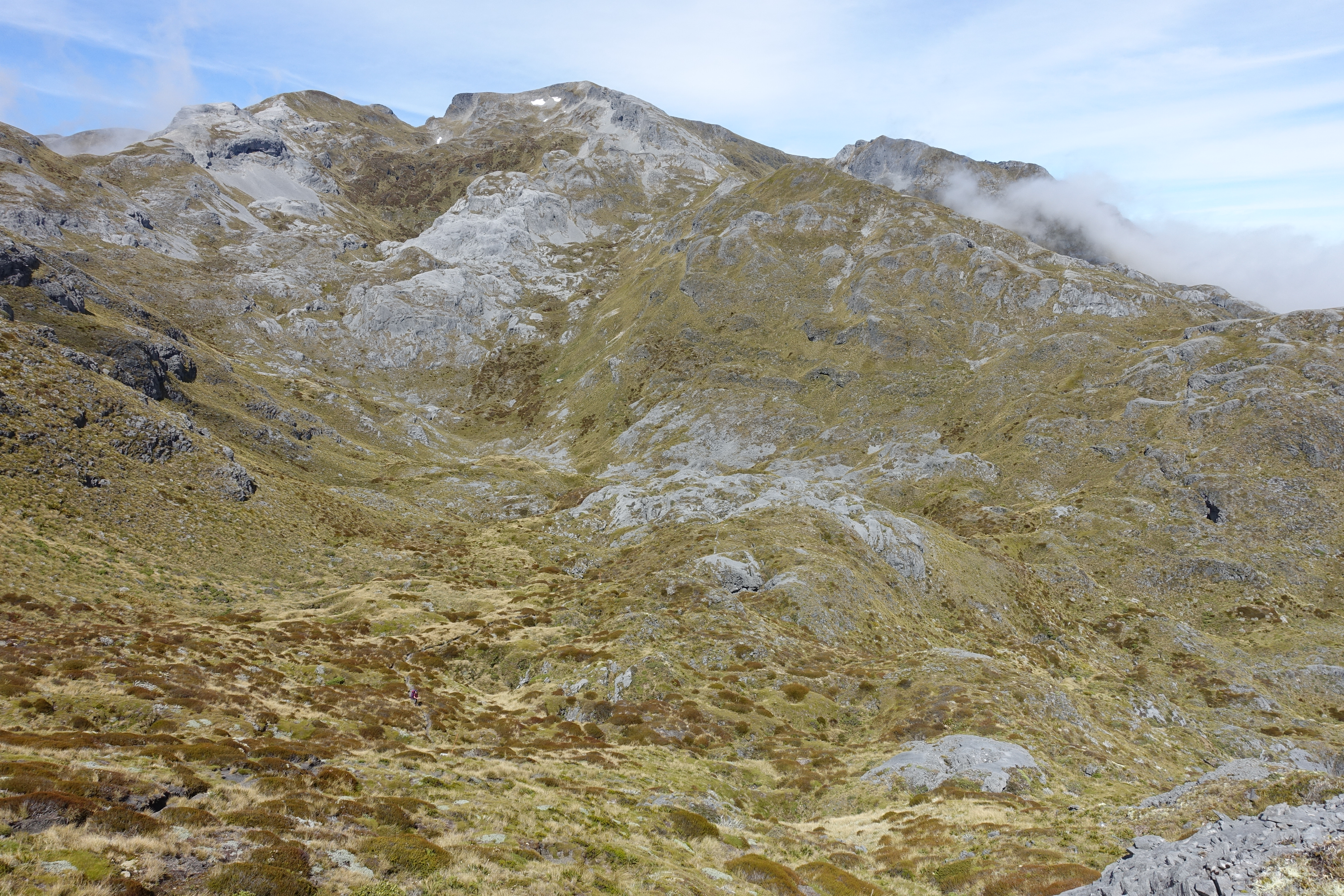
Mount Arthur, the type locality of P. funerea.

P. funerea is endemic to New Zealand and is found only in the western and central parts of the South Island.

== Habitat ==
This species inhabits shrubland in the subalpine and alpine zones.

== Behaviour ==
Adults of this species are on the wing from October to February.

== Life history and host plants ==
The life history of this species is unknown as are the larval host species.
