= Dichrorampha nigrobrunneana =

Scientific classification
- Kingdom: Animalia
- Phylum: Arthropoda
- Class: Insecta
- Order: Lepidoptera
- Family: Tortricidae
- Genus: Dichrorampha
- Species: D. nigrobrunneana

Binomial name
- Dichrorampha nigrobrunneana (Toll, 1942)

Species of moth

Dichrorampha nigrobrunneana is a moth belonging to the family Tortricidae first described by Toll in 1942.
