= Dichrorampha incognitana =

Scientific classification
- Domain: Eukaryota
- Kingdom: Animalia
- Phylum: Arthropoda
- Class: Insecta
- Order: Lepidoptera
- Family: Tortricidae
- Genus: Dichrorampha
- Species: D. incognitana

Binomial name
- Dichrorampha incognitana (Kremky & Maslowski, 1933)

Species of moth

Dichrorampha incognitana is a moth belonging to the family Tortricidae. The species was first described by Jerzy Kremky and Maslowski in 1933.

It is native to Europe.
