= Dichrorampha rilana =

Scientific classification
- Kingdom: Animalia
- Phylum: Arthropoda
- Class: Insecta
- Order: Lepidoptera
- Family: Tortricidae
- Genus: Dichrorampha
- Species: D. rilana

Binomial name
- Dichrorampha rilana Drenovski, 1909

Synonyms
- Dichrorampha rylana Drenovski, 1909

Species of moth

Dichrorampha rilana is a species of moth of the family Tortricidae. It is found in Albania and Bulgaria, where it has been recorded from the Vitosha, Rila and Pirin mountains. The habitat consists of subalpine herbaceous formations on siliceous soils.

The length of the forewings is 6.1–6.5 mm for females.

The larvae feed on Achillea clusiana.
