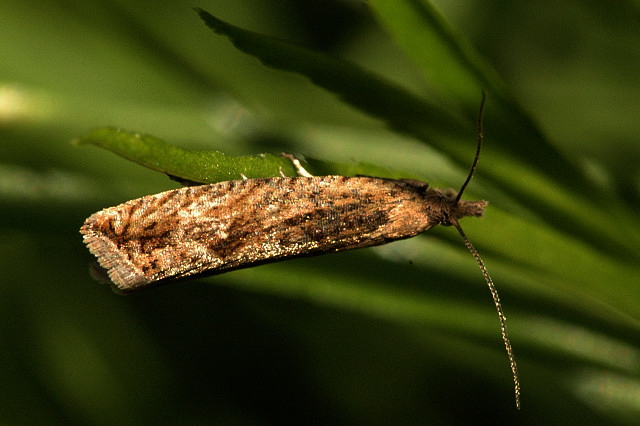

Scientific classification
- Kingdom: Animalia
- Phylum: Arthropoda
- Clade: Pancrustacea
- Class: Insecta
- Order: Lepidoptera
- Family: Tortricidae
- Genus: Dichrorampha
- Species: D. acuminatana

Binomial name
- Dichrorampha acuminatana Lienig & Zeller, 1846

= Dichrorampha acuminatana =

Species of moth

Dichrorampha acuminatana is a moth of the family Tortricidae. It is found in Europe and the Near East.

The wingspan is 10–15 mm. The costa of the forewings is straighter than in [related species].The fold reaches 1/3 . The ground colour is dark fuscous, purplish-tinged, more or less obscurely irrorated with ochreous. The costa has obscure leaden-metallic posterior streaks The basal area is paler- streaked and there is a paler broad triangular straight-edged median dorsal blotch and three black dots on the termen towards middle, sometimes nearly obsolete . The termen is straight, sinuation very slight and the white line of the cilia is sharply marked. The hindwings are light fuscous, darker in female. The larva is whitish; head light brown; plate of 2 faintly brownish.

The moth flies from May to September..

The larvae feed on Leucanthemum vulgare and tansy.

== Notes ==
1. The flight season refers to Belgium and the Netherlands. This may vary in other parts of the range.
