= Dichrorampha uralensis =

Scientific classification
- Kingdom: Animalia
- Phylum: Arthropoda
- Clade: Pancrustacea
- Class: Insecta
- Order: Lepidoptera
- Family: Tortricidae
- Genus: Dichrorampha
- Species: D. uralensis

Binomial name
- Dichrorampha uralensis (Danilevsky, 1948)

Synonyms
- Hemimene uralensis Danilevsky, 1948

Species of butterfly

Dichrorampha uralensis is a butterfly belonging to the family Tortricidae. The species was first described by Aleksandr Sergeievich Danilevsky in 1948.
