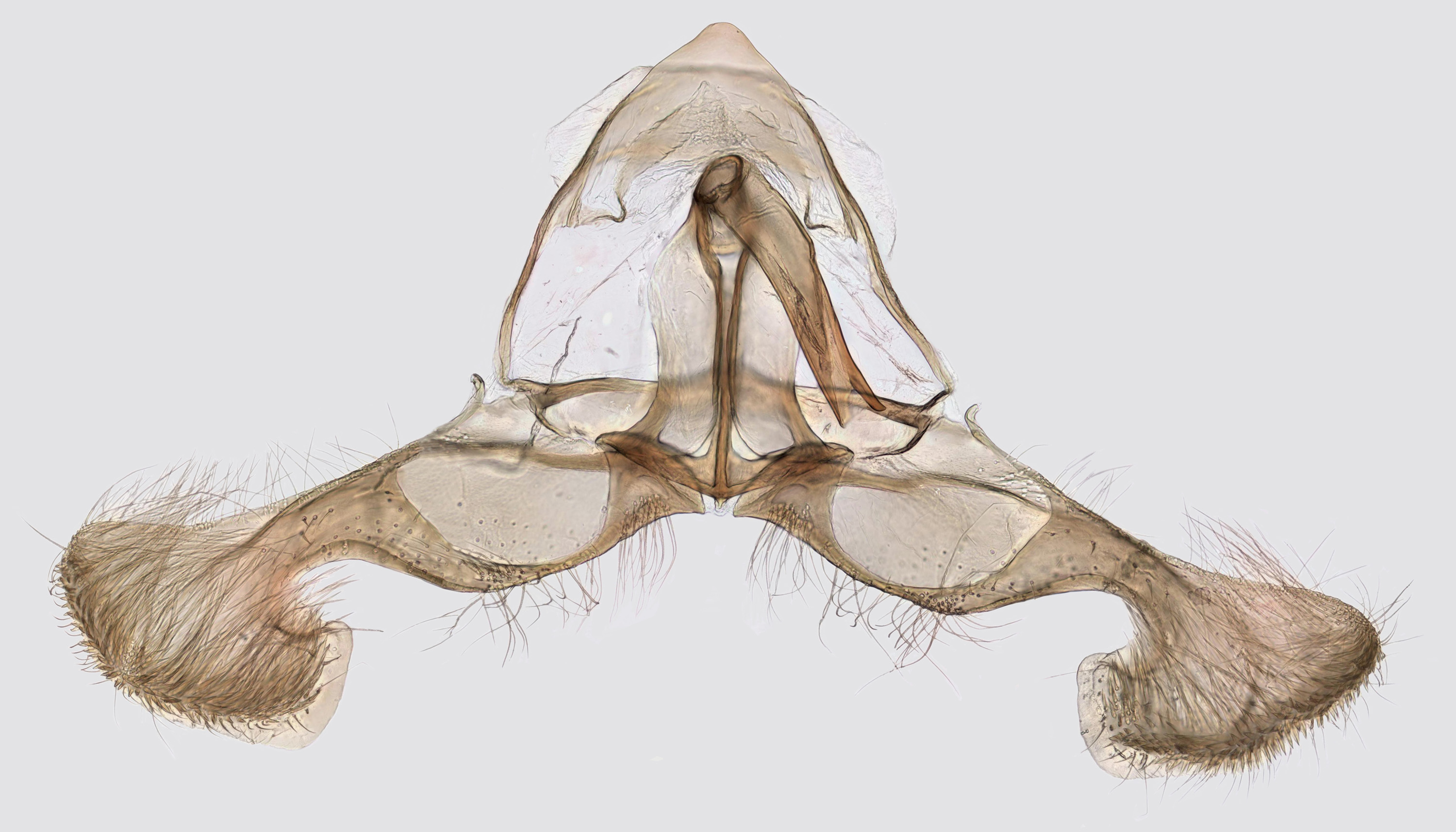
- Dichrorampha consortana male genitalia Minera, North Wales

Scientific classification
- Domain: Eukaryota
- Kingdom: Animalia
- Phylum: Arthropoda
- Class: Insecta
- Order: Lepidoptera
- Family: Tortricidae
- Genus: Dichrorampha
- Species: D. consortana

Binomial name
- Dichrorampha consortana Stephens, 1852

= Dichrorampha consortana =

Species of moth

Dichrorampha consortana is a moth belonging to the family Tortricidae. The species was first described by James Francis Stephens in 1852.

It is native to Europe and across the Palearctic. The wingspan is 9–12 mm. The species of the genus Dichrorampha are often difficult to distinguish from each other on external appearance, genitalic preparations are needed to determine the species with certainty. This species is smaller and darker than the related species. The forewings seem a little "unclean" grey-brown and do not have silvery lines at the front edge, however, some small white spots. The species lacks small black spots along the outer edge of the forewing.

The larvae live not in the roots, as do most Dichrorampha but in the upper part of the stem and inside the flower heads. The adults fly in June–July.
