= Dichrorampha senectana =

Scientific classification
- Kingdom: Animalia
- Phylum: Arthropoda
- Clade: Pancrustacea
- Class: Insecta
- Order: Lepidoptera
- Family: Tortricidae
- Genus: Dichrorampha
- Species: D. senectana

Binomial name
- Dichrorampha senectana Guenee, 1845

Species of moth

Dichrorampha senectana is a species of moth in the family Tortricidae. It was first described by Achille Guenée in 1845.

It is native to Europe. Caterpillars feed on Leucanthemum vulgare.
