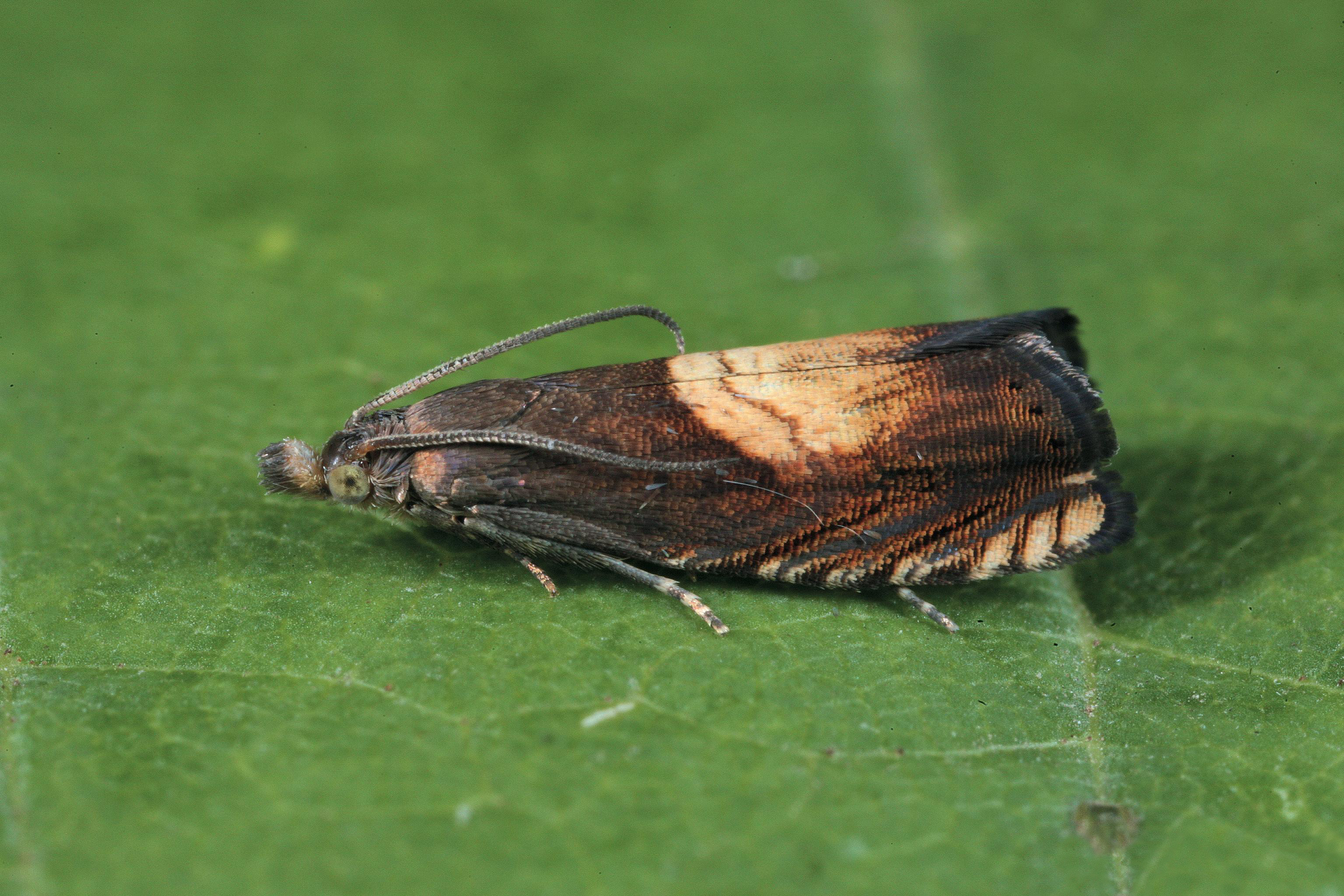

Scientific classification
- Kingdom: Animalia
- Phylum: Arthropoda
- Class: Insecta
- Order: Lepidoptera
- Family: Tortricidae
- Genus: Dichrorampha
- Species: D. heegerana

Binomial name
- Dichrorampha heegerana (Duponchel, in Godart, 1842)

Synonyms
- Ephippiphora heegerana Duponchel, in Godart, 1842; Dichrorampha heegeriana Guenee, 1845; Tortrix (Grapholitha) hegeriana Herrich-Schaffer, 1851

= Dichrorampha heegerana =

Species of moth

Dichrorampha heegerana is a species of moth of the family Tortricidae. It is found in central Europe, Sweden, Finland and Russia.

The wingspan is 11–14 mm. Adults are on wing from July to August in one generation per year.

The larvae probably feed on Asteraceae species.
