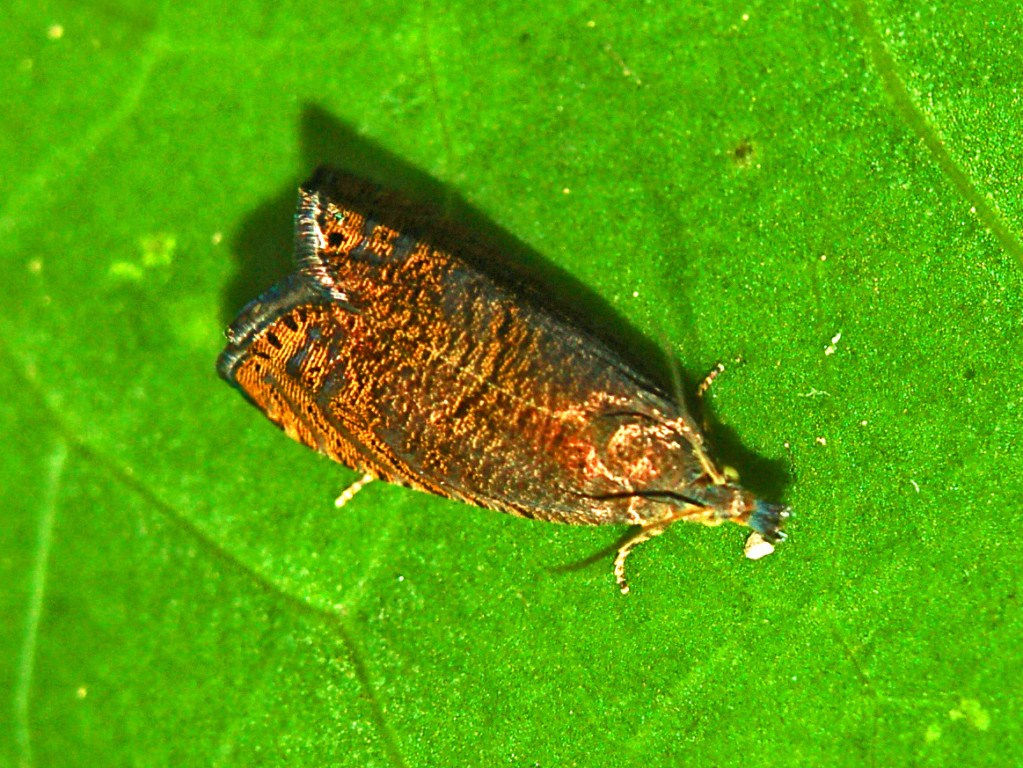

Scientific classification
- Kingdom: Animalia
- Phylum: Arthropoda
- Class: Insecta
- Order: Lepidoptera
- Family: Tortricidae
- Genus: Dichrorampha
- Species: D. sedatana

Binomial name
- Dichrorampha sedatana Busck, 1906

= Dichrorampha sedatana =

Species of moth

Dichrorampha sedatana is a moth of the family Tortricidae.

== Description ==
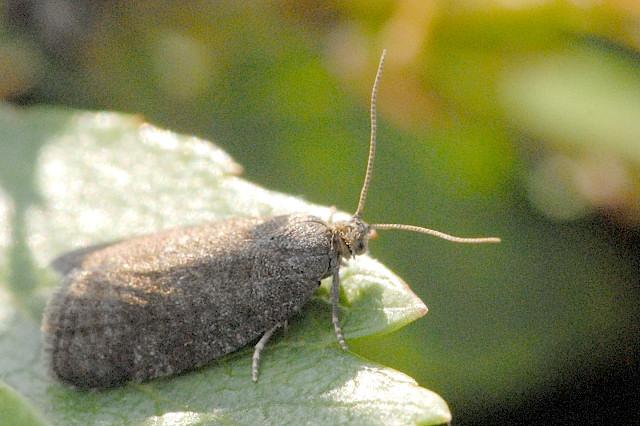
Dichrorampha sedatana

The wingspan of Dichrorampha sedatana reaches 12–16 mm. These moths fly from April to June. There is one generation per year.

The larvae mainly feed on several Asteraceae roots, especially Tanacetum vulgare, but also on other Tanacetum species and Leucanthemum.

== Distribution ==
This species is widespread in Europe.

== Habitat ==
Dichrorampha sedatana prefers rough meadows and waysides.
