= Henry Valentine Knaggs =

British doctor (1859–1954)

Henry Valentine Knaggs (14 February 1859 – 11 July 1954) was an English physician, anti-vaccinationist, naturopath and alternative health writer.

== Early life ==
He was the second son of Henry Guard Knaggs and Ellen Mares. He was born on 14 February 1859 (St Valentine's Day) in St Pancras, London, and there is no evidence that he was ever baptised.

== Education ==
Like his father and grandfather before him, he embarked on a medical career. There is no evidence of an apprenticeship but he obtained his LSA in 1881 after studying at University College London. He was awarded his MRCS and his LM in the same year and also an LRCP from the University of Edinburgh. In 1889 he is recorded as being a fellow of the Zoological Society.

== A physician ==
He worked in the service of the Peninsular and Oriental Steamship Company from 1883 to 1886 presumably on their liners. In 1889 he was resident surgeon at Boscombe Infirmary but his address, from 1883 until 1912 was 189 Camden Road, London NW where he was in general practice as a doctor.

== Family ==
He married Mabel Emily Stow on 24 June 1897 at St Paul's Church, St Pancras – Mabel's father James was just described as "gentleman" on the marriage certificate. They had two daughters – Dulcie (born 1901, who married George Menzies Trevor Lambrick (an officer in the Indian Army) 1929 in Witney), and Nora (born 1902, who married John B. Maxwell 1929 in Hatfield).

== 20th century ==
The 1913 Medical Who's Who gives Knaggs' addresses as 41 Welbeck Street and Combe Edge, Langley Park, Mill Hill. In 1914 he was living at 41 Queen Anne Street, then, to 1921 (and probably later) he was practising from the up-market address of 25 Wimpole Street, but he was living at "Arbor", Kings Langley in rural Hertfordshire. His specialities were listed as electro-therapeutics, dietetics and haematology, and his recreations as athletics and literary work of various kinds.

Even late in his life he continued in practice, in his 80s seeing patients in London's West End during The Blitz, "for which he had a nonchalant disregard".

In 1954 he was living in 80 Leigh Gardens, Kensal Rise, London.

== His publications ==
Knaggs was a prolific author. Among his more professional works are "On the Treatment of Diphtheria by Frequent Small Doses of Sulphur," "On the Treatment of Gout by Salicylate of Potash" and the like. But by far the more numerous are his books and pamphlets for the general public. They are mostly on various aspects of personal health and diet, and have been described as "mostly harmless." Examples are "Rheumatism and Allied Ailments," "The Cleansing Saline Fast," "The Misunderstood Microbe", "How to Prevent Cancer" and "Potatoes as Food and Medicine" (the last one still in print).

== His ideas ==
He was a naturopath and teetotaling vegetarian, an advocate of natural hygiene, and a long-time member of the National Anti-Vaccination League. He is reported as saying that during the last fifty years as a physician he never prescribed a single drug. He preferred raw foods to cooked ones, and plain water to milk and beverages such as tea and coffee. He was an advocate of exercise and shunned alcohol.

Knaggs was influenced by Antoine Béchamp and believed that germs were not the cause of disease but the products of tissue breakdown. He held pseudoscientific and vitalistic ideas. An article in the Medical History journal noted that Knaggs believed that the "human body took in three streams of "solar life essence", as light, as air, and as food and water: and that uncooked vegetables were "fully charged with magnetism" drawn from sun, earth and water." His vitalistic ideas were ridiculed in the British Medical Journal as unscientific.

Knaggs authored The Story of Vitamins, in 1929. It is alleged that he investigated vitamins in 1910 before Casimir Funk and Frederick Gowland Hopkins discovered them.

Knaggs was influenced by Theosophy. He stated that his book Blood and Superman "to a large extent [is] based on Theosophical teaching."

== His death ==
He died at the age of 95, on 11 July 1954. In his will, he stipulated that his body was to be cremated, the ashes to be scattered, and that there should be no flowers, tombstone or other memorial. He left his furniture and personal effects to his "friend" Mrs Lily Colburn (who shared his address), and the rest of his estate to be divided equally between his wife (who died in 1962) and this "friend."

The Times obituary described him as "a man of great physical courage" who "had the gift of making little fuss aout the details of life". Saying that he had lived to see many of his originally controversial views on diet and hygiene generally accepted, it concluded that "his loss will be deeply regretted by the thousands to whom his name is a household word".

== Bibliography ==
- 1887 – A short treatise on the cure of Diphtheria by small doses of sulphur.
- 1889 – Onions & Cress. [A description of their uses and properties.]
- 1906 – Help for Chronic Sufferers.
- 1908 – The "Microbe" as Friend and Foe.
- 1909 – The Cause and Cure of Consumption.
- 1910 – Indigestion, its Cause and Cure.
- 1911 – The Healthy Life Beverage Book.
- 1911 – A Common Stomach Trouble. (Stomach Trouble-dilated stomach.)
- 1913 – Rheumatism and allied ailments. Short chapters on rheumatism, the uric acid theory of disease, rheumatic fever and arthritis.
- 1913 – The Truth about Sugar.
- 1914 – The Truth about Vaccination: The Nature and Origin of Vaccine Lymph, and the Teachings of the New Bacteriology.
- 1915 – Blood and Superman.
- 1919 – Diabetes, its causes and treatment.
- 1919 – Why Our Teeth Decay (or Pyorrhea Unveiled).
- 1919 – The Spine in Relation to Health, with remedial spinal exercises.
- 1919 – The Lemon Cure.
- 1919 – The Salad Road to Health.
- 1919 – A First Aid to Internal Cleanliness.
- 1919 – Noises in the Head and Ear Troubles
- 1919 – Basic Diagnosis and Reconstructive Treatment, etc.
- 1920 – The Mischief of Milk.
- 1921 – Things that count in Diet.
- 1923 – The Right & Wrong Uses of Sugar.
- 1924 – The "Microbe" as Friend & Foe.
- 1924 – Small-Pox. A healing crisis and the truth about vaccination.
- 1925 – An Epitome of the "Nature Cure" System of Medicine.
- 1926 – Consumption and Tomorrow.
- 1929 – The Story of Vitamins.
- 1930 – Potatoes as Food & Medicine.
- 1930 – The Cleansing Saline Fast.
- 1930 – The Misunderstood Microbe.
- 1931 – Safe & Easy Childbirth.
- 1931 – The Romance of Sugar.
- 1932 – How to Prevent Cancer, etc.
- 1933 – Our Daily Bread.
- 1934 – Epsom Salts. Its mysterious healing powers explained
- 1936 – Tea and Coffee in Relation to Health.
