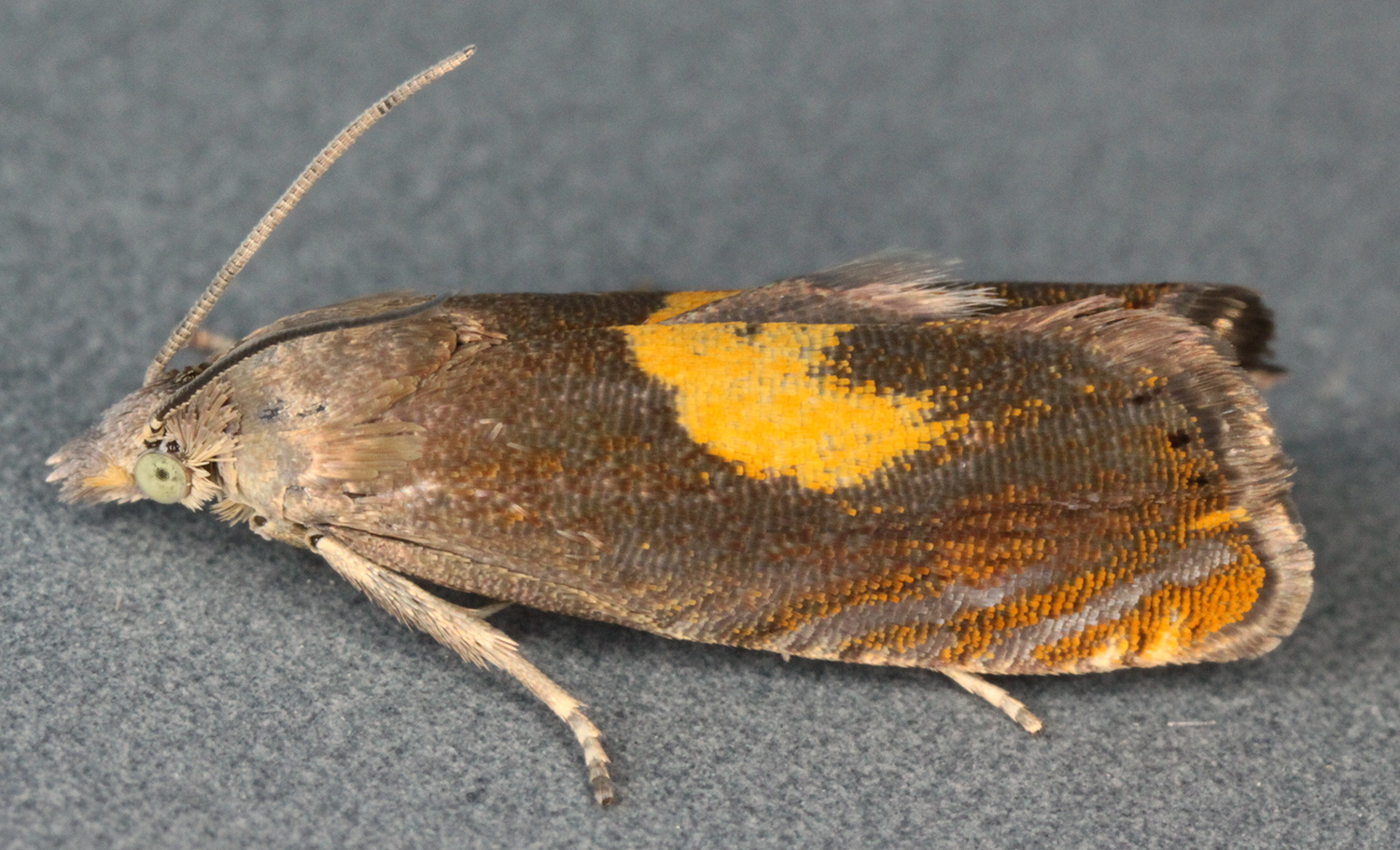

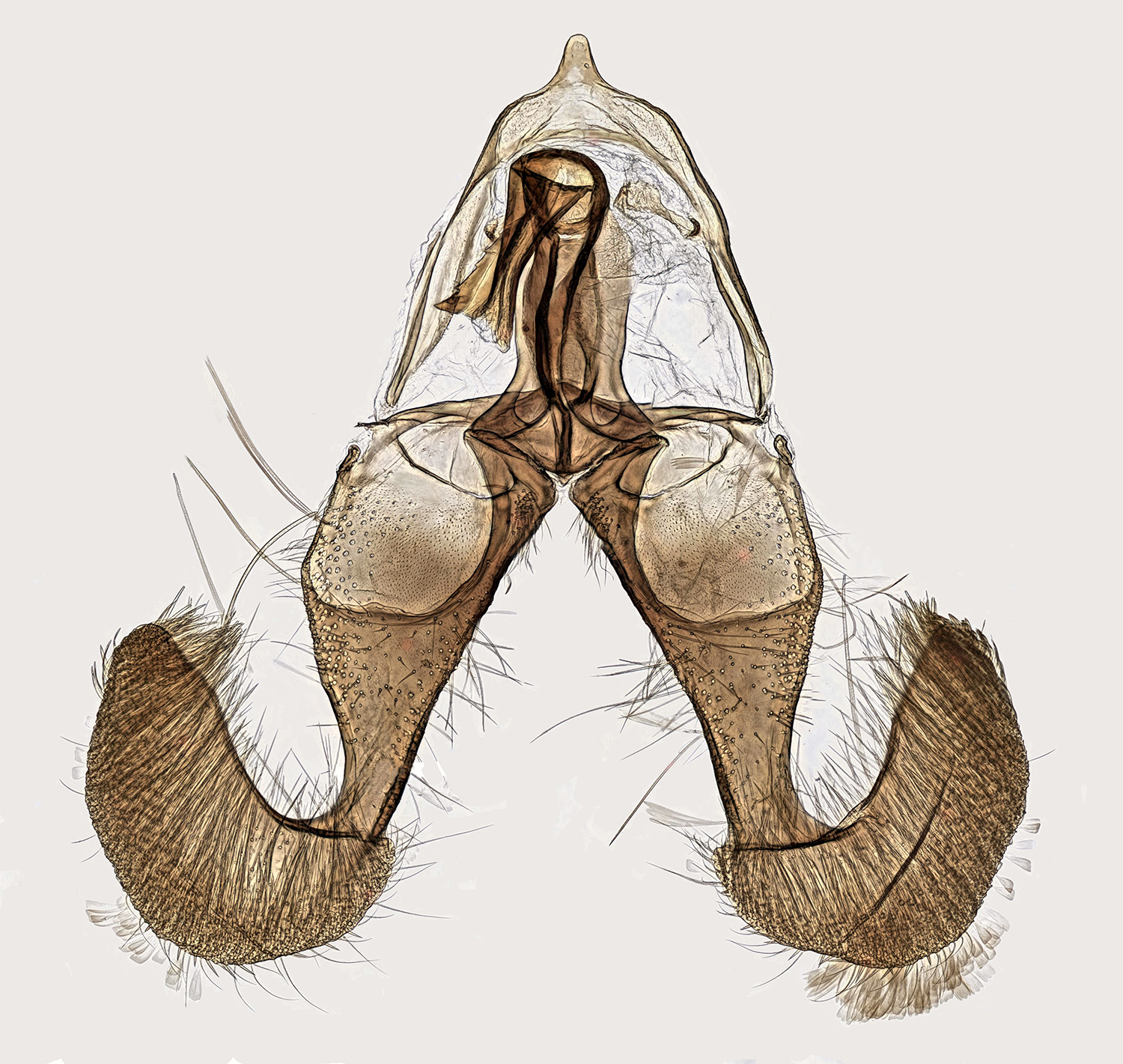
- Male genitalia

Scientific classification
- Kingdom: Animalia
- Phylum: Arthropoda
- Class: Insecta
- Order: Lepidoptera
- Family: Tortricidae
- Genus: Dichrorampha
- Species: D. alpinana

Binomial name
- Dichrorampha alpinana (Treitschke, in Ochsenheimer, 1830)

Synonyms
- Grapholitha alpinana Treitschke, in Ochsenheimer, 1830; Dichrorampha novickii Prffer, 1923; Dichrorampha alpinana var. quaestionana Zeller, 1878; Dichrorampha questionana Drenowski, 1910

= Dichrorampha alpinana =

Broad-blotch drill

Species of moth

Dichrorampha alpinana, the broad-blotch drill, is a species of moth of the family Tortricidae. It is found in almost all of Europe.

The wingspan is 13–15 mm. The forewings are rather dark fuscous, much mixed or almost wholly suffused with orange or bright ferruginous. The costa is posteriorly strigulated with whitish. There is a dull orange very oblique transverse median dorsal blotch, the edges nearly straight and two dark leaden -metallic very oblique streaks from costa posteriorly. There are three black dots on the middle of the termen, and a pale subapical dash. The hindwings are dark fuscous, lighter basally. The larva is yellow-whitish; head light brown;plate of 2 brownish-tinged.

Adults are on wing from June to August. They are often on wing during the day.

The larvae feed on Leucanthemum vulgare, Chrysanthemum leucanthemum, Achillea millefolium and Tanacetum species. They feed on the roots of their host plant.
