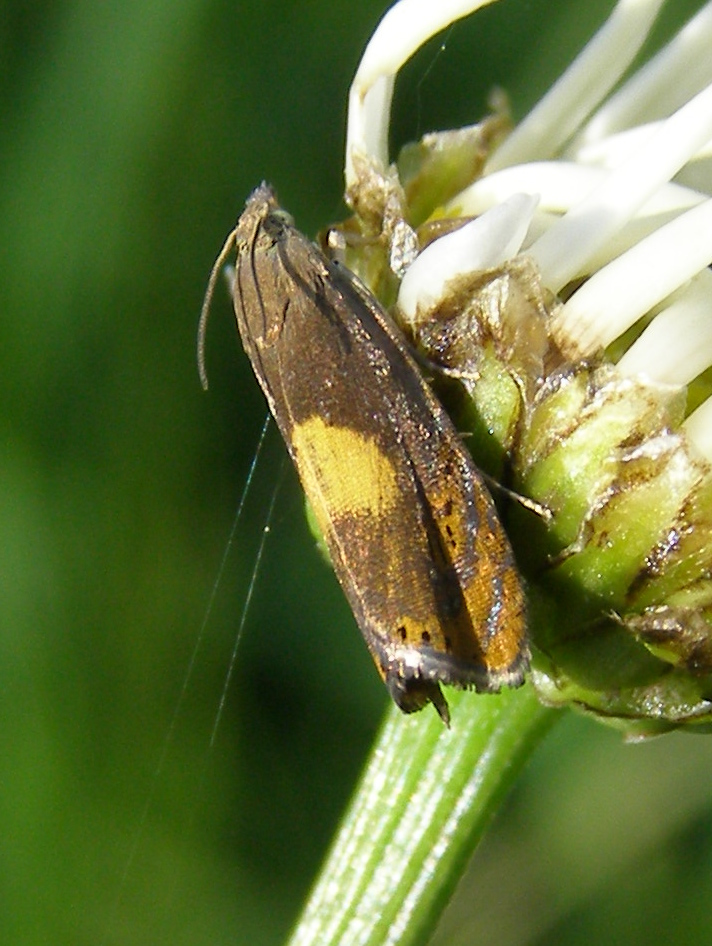
- Dichrorampha alpinana

Scientific classification
- Domain: Eukaryota
- Kingdom: Animalia
- Phylum: Arthropoda
- Class: Insecta
- Order: Lepidoptera
- Family: Tortricidae
- Tribe: Grapholitini
- Genus: Dichrorampha; Guenée, 1845

= Dichrorampha =

Genus of tortrix moths

Dichrorampha is a genus of moths belonging to the subfamily Olethreutinae of the family Tortricidae.

== Species ==
- Dichrorampha abhasica Danilevsky, in Danilevsky & Kuznetsov, 1968
- Dichrorampha acuminatana (Lienig & Zeller, 1846)
- Dichrorampha aeratana (Pierce & Metcalfe, 1915)
- Dichrorampha agilana (Tengstrom, 1848)
- Dichrorampha alaicana Rebel, 1910
- Dichrorampha alatavica (Danilevsky, 1960)
- Dichrorampha albicapitana (Walsingham, 1891)
- Dichrorampha albimacula (Danilevsky, 1948)
- Dichrorampha albistriana Komai, 1979
- Dichrorampha alexandrae Passerin d'Entrves, 1972
- Dichrorampha alpigenana Heinemann, 1863
- Dichrorampha alpinana (Treitschke, in Ochsenheimer, 1830)
- Dichrorampha altaica Danilevsky, in Danilevsky & Kuznetsov, 1968
- Dichrorampha ambrosiana (Kennel, 1919)
- Dichrorampha assumptana (Walker, 1863)
- Dichrorampha aztecana Walsingham, 1914
- Dichrorampha baixerasana Trematerra, 1991
- Dichrorampha banana (Busck, 1906)
- Dichrorampha bittana (Busck, 1906)
- Dichrorampha broui Knudson, 1987
- Dichrorampha bugnionana (Duponchel, in Godart, 1842)
- Dichrorampha cacaleana (Herrich-Schaffer, 1851)
- Dichrorampha cancellatana Kennel, 1901
- Dichrorampha canimaculana Komai, 1979
- Dichrorampha caucasica (Danilevsky, 1948)
- Dichrorampha chavanneana (Laharpe, 1858)
- Dichrorampha cinerascens (Danilevsky, 1948)
- Dichrorampha cinerosana (Herrich-Schaffer, 1851)
- Dichrorampha comptana (Walker, 1863)
- Dichrorampha coniana Obraztsov, 1953
- Dichrorampha consortana Stephens, 1852
- Dichrorampha dana Kearfott, 1907
- Dichrorampha danilevskyi Obraztsov, 1958
- Dichrorampha dekanoidzei Esartiya, 1988
- Dichrorampha dentivalva Huemer, 1996
- Dichrorampha discedana (Danilevsky, 1960)
- Dichrorampha distinctana (Herrich-Schaffer, 1851)
- Dichrorampha dzhungarica (Danilevsky, 1948)
- Dichrorampha embolaea (Meyrick, 1918)
- Dichrorampha euterpes Diakonoff, 1971
- Dichrorampha eximia (Danilevsky, 1948)
- Dichrorampha figurana (Zeller, 1877)
- Dichrorampha filipjevi (Danilevsky, 1948)
- Dichrorampha flavidorsana Knaggs, 1867
- Dichrorampha forsteri Obraztsov, 1953
- Dichrorampha gemellana (Zeller, 1847)
- Dichrorampha gracilis (Danilevsky, 1948)
- Dichrorampha gruneriana (Herrich-Schaffer, 1851)
- Dichrorampha hannemanni Kuznetzov, 1986
- Dichrorampha harpeana Frey, 1870
- Dichrorampha heegerana (Duponchel, in Godart, 1842)
- Dichrorampha iberica Kuznetzov, 1972
- Dichrorampha impuncta Komai, 1979
- Dichrorampha incanana (Clemens, 1860)
- Dichrorampha incognitana (Kremky & Mas owski, 1933)
- Dichrorampha inconspiqua (Danilevsky, 1948)
- Dichrorampha incursana (Herrich-Schaffer, 1851)
- Dichrorampha infuscata (Danilevsky, 1960)
- Dichrorampha insperata (Danilevsky, 1960)
- Dichrorampha interponana (Danilevsky, 1960)
- Dichrorampha iranica Danilevsky, in Danilevsky & Kuznetsov, 1968
- Dichrorampha iverica Esartiya, 1988
- Dichrorampha klimeschiana Toll, 1955
- Dichrorampha kuznetzovi Esartiya, 1988
- Dichrorampha larsana (Danilevsky, 1960)
- Dichrorampha lasithicana Rebel, 1916
- Dichrorampha latiflavana Caradja, 1916
- Dichrorampha leopardana (Busck, 1906)
- Dichrorampha letarfensis Gibeaux, 1983
- Dichrorampha ligulana (Herrich-Schaffer, 1851)
- Dichrorampha livens (Walsingham, 1891)
- Dichrorampha manilkara Heppner, 1981
- Dichrorampha marginestriana (Filipjev, 1925)
- Dichrorampha marmarocyma (Meyrick, in Caradja, 1931)
- Dichrorampha montanana (Duponchel, in Godart, 1842)
- Dichrorampha niculescui (St noiu & Neme, 1974)
- Dichrorampha nigrobrunneana (Toll, 1942)
- Dichrorampha obscuratana (Wolff, 1955)
- Dichrorampha okui Komai, 1979
- Dichrorampha pastoralisi Razowski & Tokár, 2003
- Dichrorampha pentheriana (Rebel, 1917)
- Dichrorampha petiverella (Linnaeus, 1758)
- Dichrorampha piperana (Busck, 1906)
- Dichrorampha plumbana (Scopoli, 1763)
- Dichrorampha podoliensis (Toll, 1942)
- Dichrorampha proxima (Danilevsky, 1948)
- Dichrorampha radicicolana Walsingham, 1879
- Dichrorampha rejectana (Laharpe, 1858)
- Dichrorampha rilana Drenovski, 1909
- Dichrorampha rjabovi (Danilevsky, 1948)
- Dichrorampha sapodilla Heppner, 1981
- Dichrorampha sedatana (Busck, 1906)
- Dichrorampha senectana Guenee, 1845
- Dichrorampha sequana (Hubner, [1796-1799])
- Dichrorampha sericana (Kennel, 1901)
- Dichrorampha simpliciana (Haworth, [1811])
- Dichrorampha simulana (Clemens, 1860)
- Dichrorampha sinensis Kuznetzov, 1971
- Dichrorampha striatimacula Kuznetzov, 1972
- Dichrorampha sugii Kawabe, 1989
- Dichrorampha sylvicolana Heinemann, 1863
- Dichrorampha tayulingensis Kawabe, 1986
- Dichrorampha teichiana ulcs & Kerppola, 1997
- Dichrorampha testacea Komai, 1979
- Dichrorampha thomanni Huemer, 1991
- Dichrorampha tianshanica (Danilevsky, 1960)
- Dichrorampha tshetverikovi (Danilevsky, 1960)
- Dichrorampha typhlodes (Meyrick, 1931)
- Dichrorampha unicolor (Danilevsky, 1948)
- Dichrorampha uralensis (Danilevsky, 1948)
- Dichrorampha vacivana (Chrtien, 1925)
- Dichrorampha vancouverana McDunnough, 1935
- Dichrorampha velata Schmid & Huemer, 2021

== See also ==
- List of Tortricidae genera
