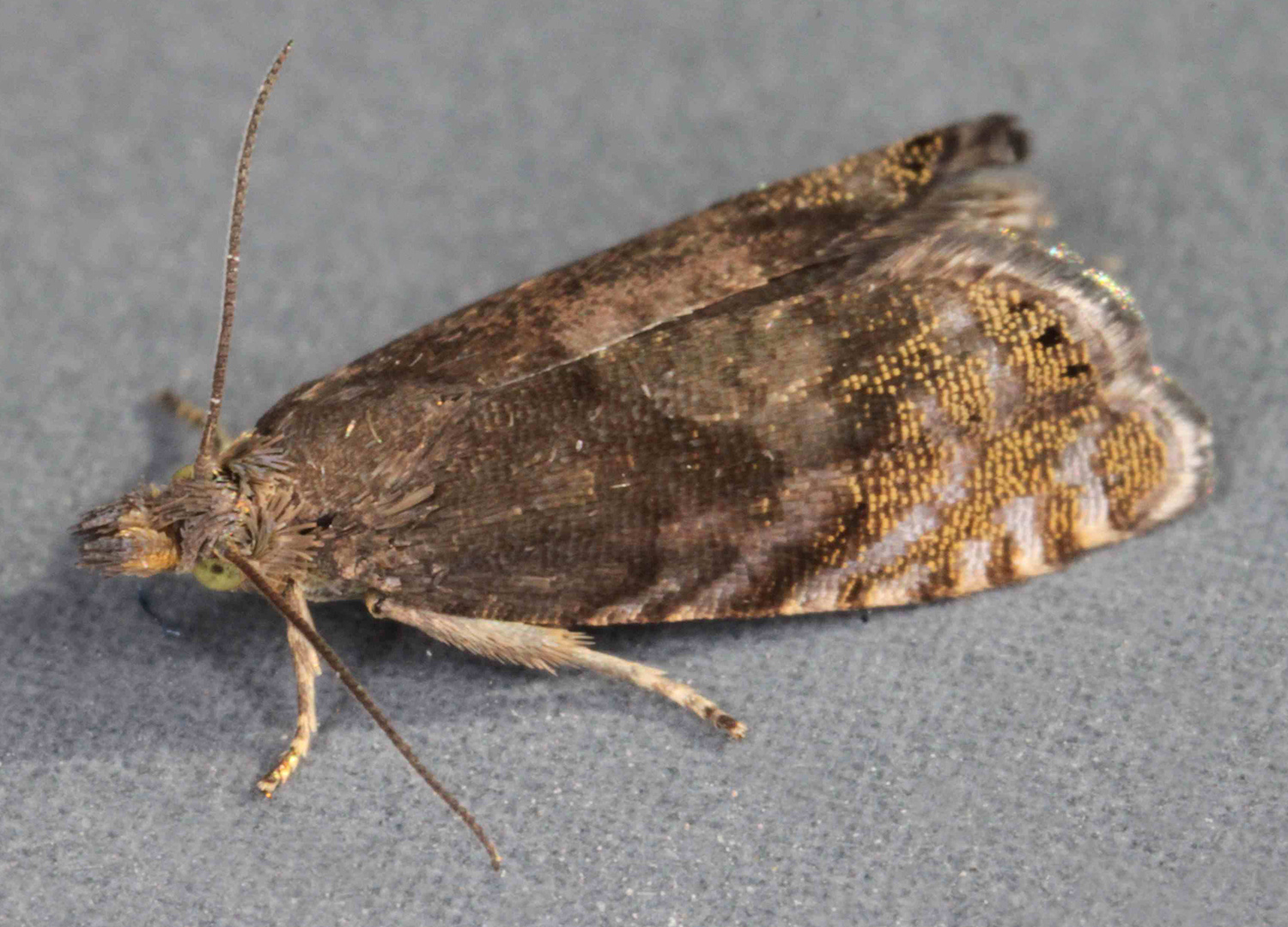
- Dichrorampha plumbana, Caen y coed, North Wales, May 2010

Scientific classification
- Domain: Eukaryota
- Kingdom: Animalia
- Phylum: Arthropoda
- Class: Insecta
- Order: Lepidoptera
- Family: Tortricidae
- Genus: Dichrorampha
- Species: D. plumbana

Binomial name
- Dichrorampha plumbana (Scopoli, 1763)

= Dichrorampha plumbana =

Species of moth

Dichrorampha plumbana is a moth belonging to the family Tortricidae first described by Giovanni Antonio Scopoli in 1763. It is native to the Palearctic including Europe.

The wingspan is 11–14 mm. The forewings are dark fuscous, sharply irrorated with pale ochreous, costa obscurely spotted with dark fuscous and whitish; anterior half obscurely striated or suffused with greyish, forming a slightly paler subtriangular median dorsal blotch; some streaks from costa posteriorly and margins of ocellus leaden-metallic; from three to five black dots on termen; termen rather oblique, sinuation distinct. Hindwings fuscous or dark fuscous. The larva is yellowish- white; head yellow -brownish; plate of 2 ochreous.

The larva develops on the roots of yarrow Achillea millefolium and Leucanthemum vulgare,. The adults fly during the day and into the evening in May–June.
