= Henry Guard Knaggs =

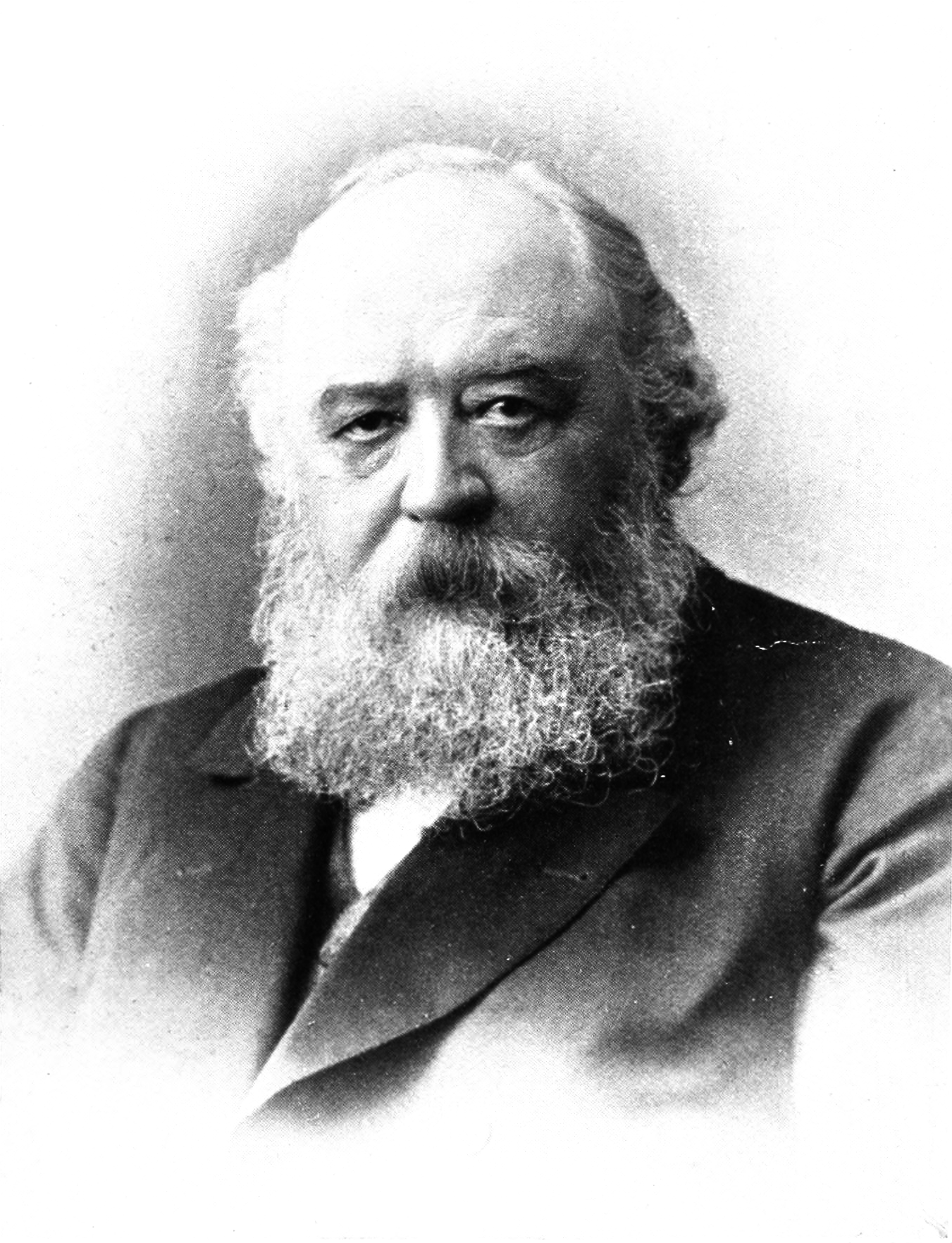

Henry Guard Knaggs (21 March 1832 – 16 January 1908) was one of the best known Victorian entomologists and the author of The Lepidopterist's Guide (1869).

Knaggs was born in Camden Town, London. He married Ellen Mares and had six children, five girls and a boy (Florence, Mary, Isobel, Nancy, Ethel and Henry Valentine). Knaggs was educated at University College School and then trained as a medical doctor at University College Hospital (the same profession as his father).

Knaggs was an active fellow of the Entomological Society between 1858 and 1863, Knagg then went on to cofound the Entomologist's Monthly Magazine in 1864 and continued to edit until 1874 when pressure from work caused him to resign.

His most celebrated work was the publication of The Lepidopterist's Guide and A List of Macro-Lepidoptera Occurring in the Neighbourhood of Folkestone.

Knaggs had several major discoveries including Chortodes bondii and the first known breeding colony of Clostera anachoreta.

Following his death in 1908 he left his medical practice to his son Henry Valentine.

He was buried on the western side of Highgate Cemetery. His grave (plot no.9285) no longer has a readable headstone.
