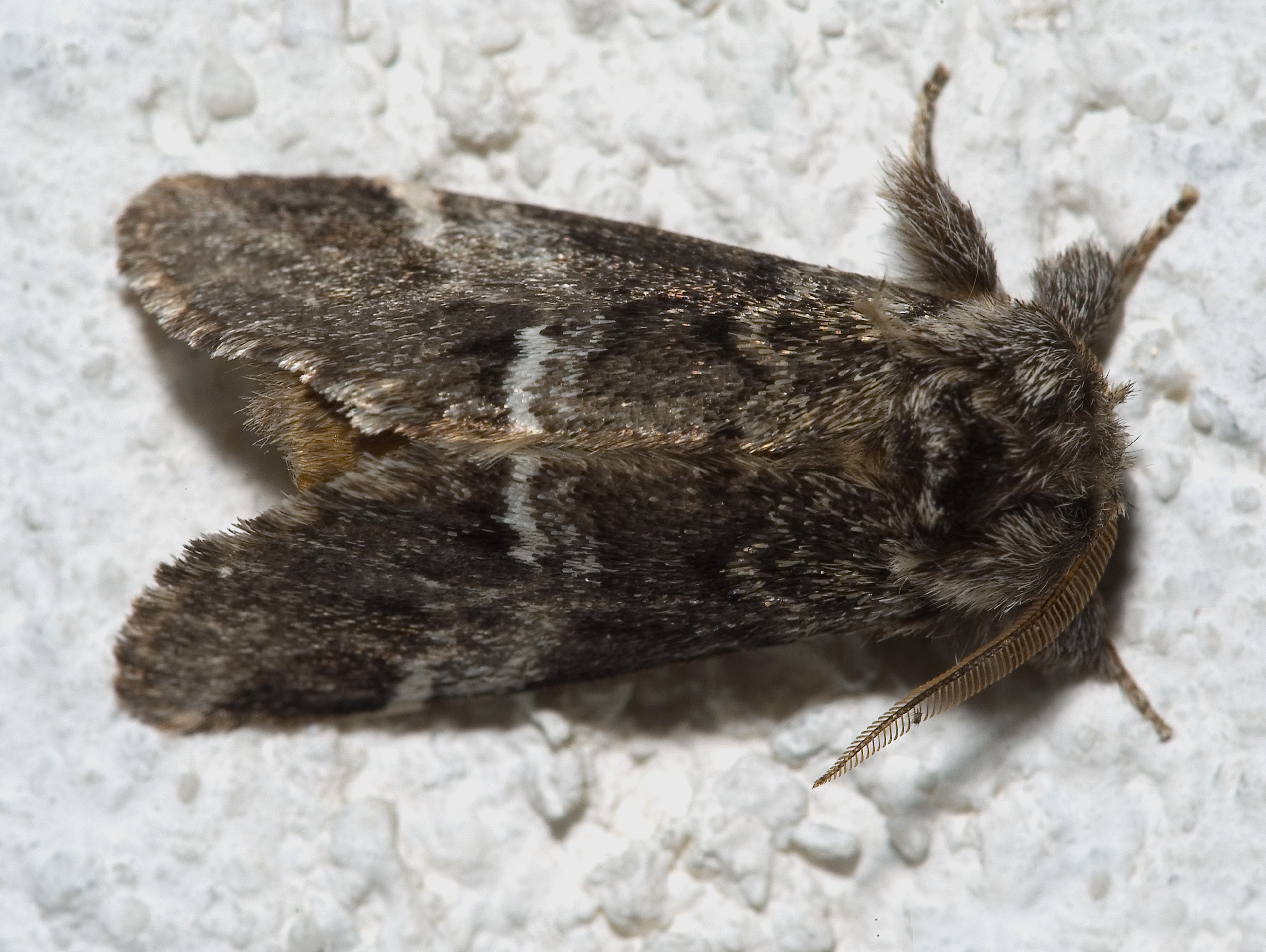

Scientific classification
- Kingdom: Animalia
- Phylum: Arthropoda
- Clade: Pancrustacea
- Class: Insecta
- Order: Lepidoptera
- Superfamily: Noctuoidea
- Family: Notodontidae
- Genus: Drymonia
- Species: D. dodonaea

Binomial name
- Drymonia dodonaea (Denis & Schiffermüller, 1775)

= Drymonia dodonaea =

Marbled brown

Species of moth

Drymonia dodonaea, the marbled brown, is a moth of the family Notodontidae. The species was first described by Michael Denis and Ignaz Schiffermüller in 1775. It is found in Europe and in the area surrounding the Caucasus.

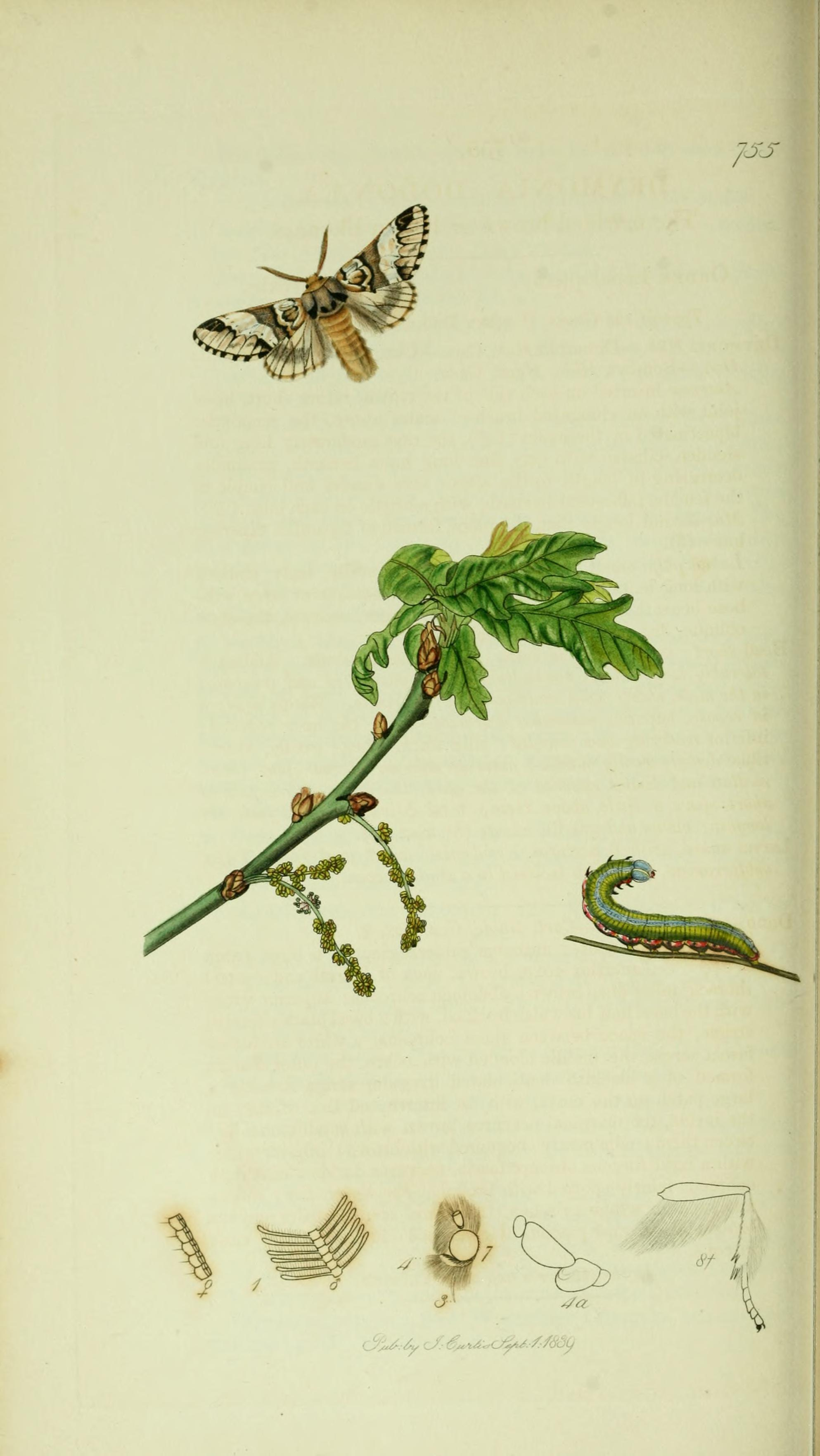
Illustration from John Curtis's British Entomology Volume 5

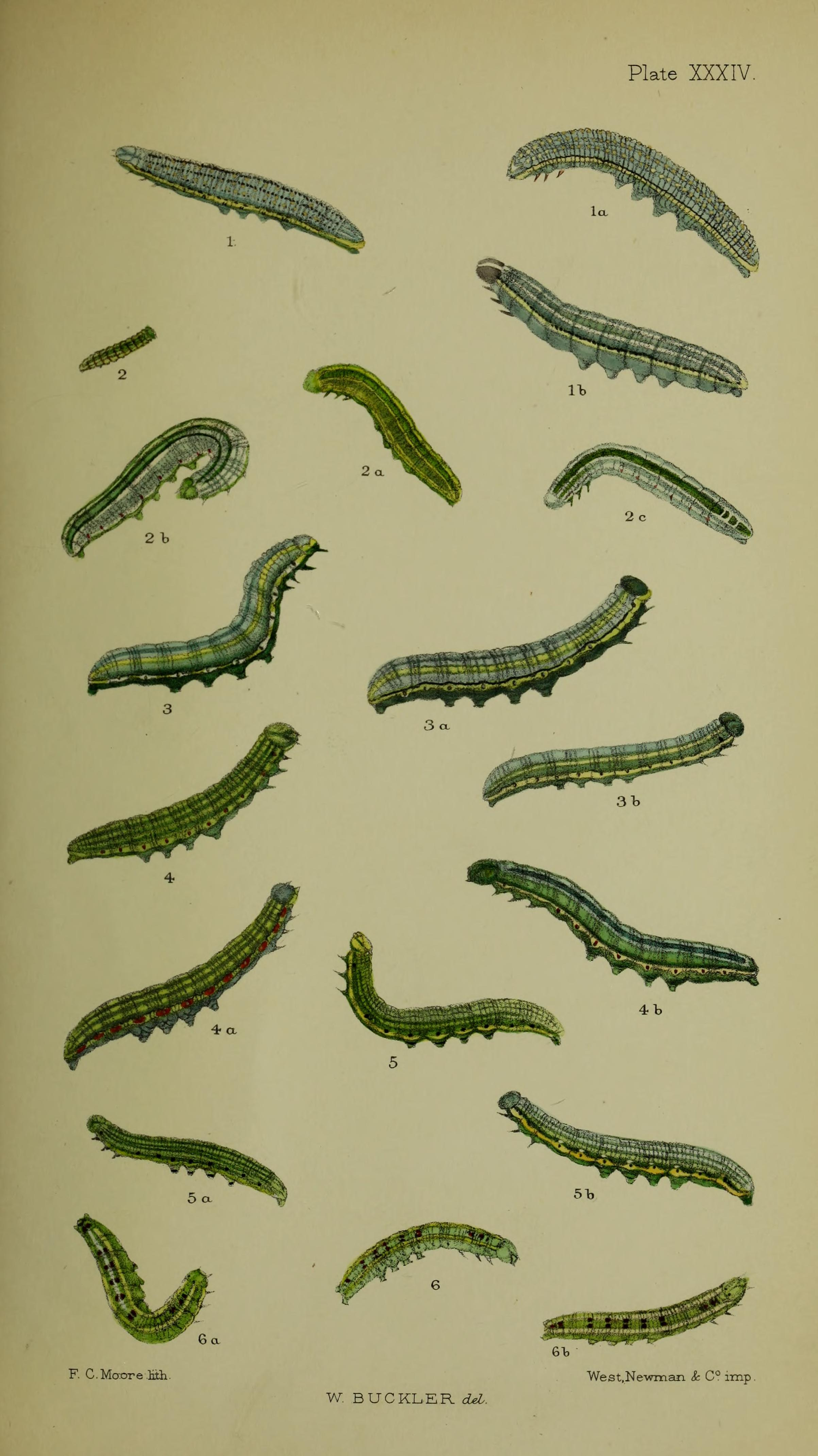
Figs. 4, 4a, 4b larvae after last moult

== Description ==
The wingspan is 33–38 mm. Similar to Drymonia ruficornis, but the forewings are generally whiter; the crosslines are less straight, and there is no black crescent above the centre of the wings. The larva is naked and without any conspicuous outgrowths. It is yellow-green on the dorsum, has a red-edged yellow lateral stripe and it is bluish-green under this stripe.

== Technical description ==
Forewing whitish grey, with 2 black basal dots, a broad transverse band which is constricted in the middle and proximally edged with blackish scaling, and a distal dark dentate band which is broad at the costal margin, tapers to the hind margin and forms an intensely black-brown angle-mark on vein 2; distal margin with sharp dark brown spots. Hindwing grey brown. The scheme of markings of the forewing somewhat recalls Cerura. ab. albida Rebel belongs to trimacula [synonym]; the whole median area of the forewing is uniformly white apart from the two bands. — In the southern dodonaea districts predominates a uniformly darker coloured and usually somewhat smaller form, dodonaea Hbn [sensu stricto], ground-colour blackish grey-brown, only the outer half of the median area forming a white band, which is traversed by a blackish line accompanying the outer dark band. The extreme of this form is represented by ab. fusca Rebel, in which the forewing is uniformly black-grey without markings. —. — The form which represents the species in Eastern Asia, the southern Ussuri district and Japan, dodonides Stgr. (45 e),[ now full species Drymonia dodonides (Staudinger, 1887)] likewise differs from dodonaea in the uniformly darker colouring; moreover, the outer transverse band and the proximal edge of the inner one are essentially more deeply dentate. —Egg pale greenish, minutely punctured. Larva glossy light green, with 2 dorsal whitish longitudinal lines and a yellow stripe on a level with the spiracles, the stripe often spotted red. Pupa black-brown, with 4 small hooks at the anal end; in a silk-lined cell in the ground.

== Biology ==
In the North the moth flies from May to July. In Southern Germany and further south the species has two broods, the larva being full-grown in June and October; moths from hibernated pupae are met with very early in the year, often already the end of April and in May, the second brood being on the wing in August.

The larvae feed on various deciduous trees, primarily Quercus but also Fagus and Betula. The male, but not the female comes to light. Females are rarely found at all, probably because they stay up in the tree crowns. After mating, the female lays 150 – 200 eggs in small groups on the underside of oak leaves, which hatch after eight to ten days. The newly hatched larvae usually live in small groups, older larvae live singly. They eat the leaves from the tip inwards so that only the middle nerve is left. When the larva is fully grown in August – September, it crawls down on the ground, spinning an oval, earthy cocoon and transforming into a pupa which overwinters. Sometimes the pupa can overwinter twice before hatching.
