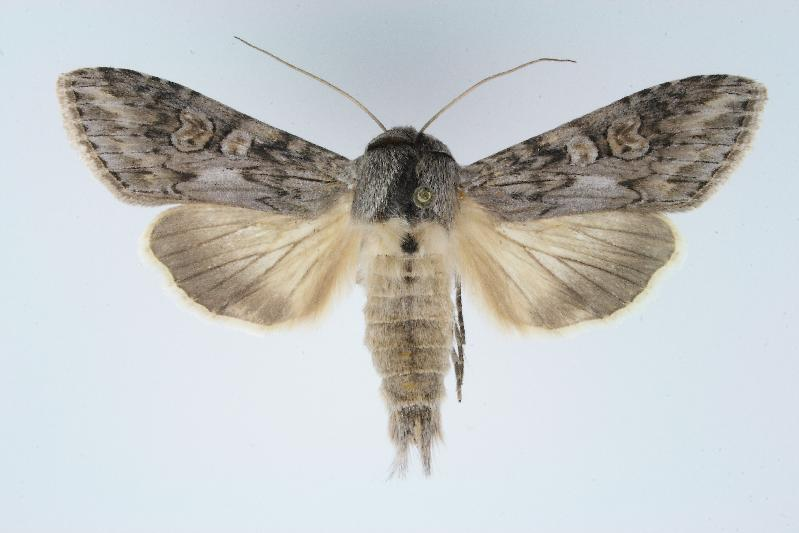

Scientific classification
- Domain: Eukaryota
- Kingdom: Animalia
- Phylum: Arthropoda
- Class: Insecta
- Order: Lepidoptera
- Superfamily: Noctuoidea
- Family: Noctuidae
- Genus: Cucullia
- Species: C. artemisiae

Binomial name
- Cucullia artemisiae (Hufnagel, 1766)

Synonyms
- Phalaena artemisiae Hufnagel, 1766; Cucullia abrotani Denis & Schiffermüller, 1775

= Cucullia artemisiae =

Scarce wormwood

Species of moth

Cucullia artemisiae, or scarce wormwood, is a moth of the family Noctuidae. The species was first described by Johann Siegfried Hufnagel in 1766. It is found from central and southern Europe to Turkey and across the Palearctic to western Siberia, Central Asia, Manchuria, the Korean Peninsula and Japan.

== Technical description and variation ==
C. artemisiae Hufn. (= abrotani F.) (26 c). Forewing grey with grey-brown suffusion along costa and the course of the lines; lines double, dark; the inner angled outwards between and inwards the outer clear only below middle; veins finely black; a pale space below cell represents the claviform stigma, which is sometimes edged above and below by two fine black lines; orbicular and reniform distinct, with brown centres and whitish grey annuli outlined with black; subterminal line followed by a diffused row of dentate brownish marks; hindwing brownish, paler towards base — the ab. lindei Heyne [now full species Cucullia lindei Heyne, 1899 ] (26 c), from the neighbourhood of Moscow only, is a local form in which the forewing is suffused throughout with blackish grey. — Larva green, with darker segmental lines; dorsal line white, fine; lateral stripe broad, yellow, somewhat interrupted; spiracles white in black rings; tubercles red; head brown, blackish behind, with a pale-edged frontal triangle; venter pale green with two fine green lines, which on 3rd and 4 th segments show redbrown.

The wingspan is 37–42 mm.

== Biology ==
Adults are on wing from June to July.

The larvae feed on Artemisia species, including Artemisia absinthium, Artemisia campestris and Artemisia vulgaris. Other recorded food plants include Matricaria and Tanacetum vulgare.
