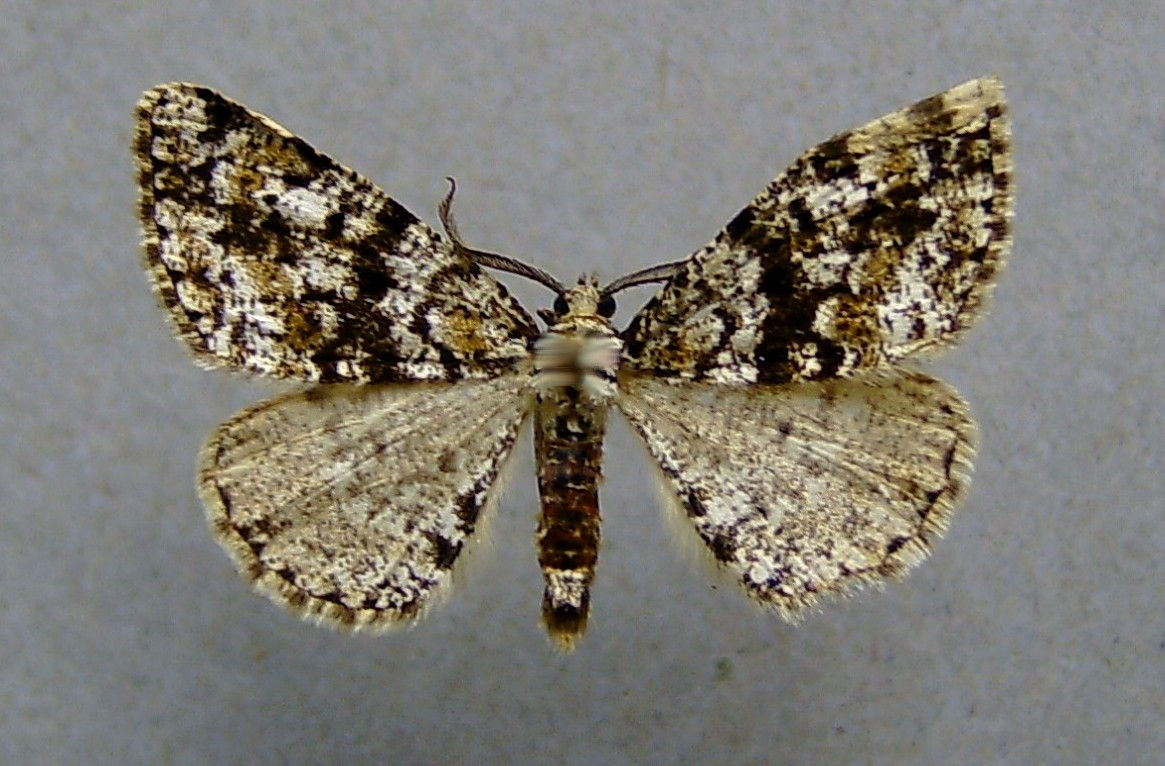

Scientific classification
- Kingdom: Animalia
- Phylum: Arthropoda
- Class: Insecta
- Order: Lepidoptera
- Family: Geometridae
- Genus: Fagivorina
- Species: F. arenaria

Binomial name
- Fagivorina arenaria (Hufnagel, 1767)

Synonyms
- Phalaena arenaria Hufnagel, 1767

= Fagivorina arenaria =

Species of moth

Fagivorina arenaria, the speckled beauty, is a moth of the family Geometridae. The species was first described by Johann Siegfried Hufnagel in 1767. It is found from most of central Europe to the Balkan Peninsula and Ukraine. In the south it is found up to Sicily and in the north to Sweden and Norway.

The wingspan is 22–30 mm. Adults are on wing from May to July.

The larvae feed on deciduous trees, including Fagus sylvatica and Quercus species.
