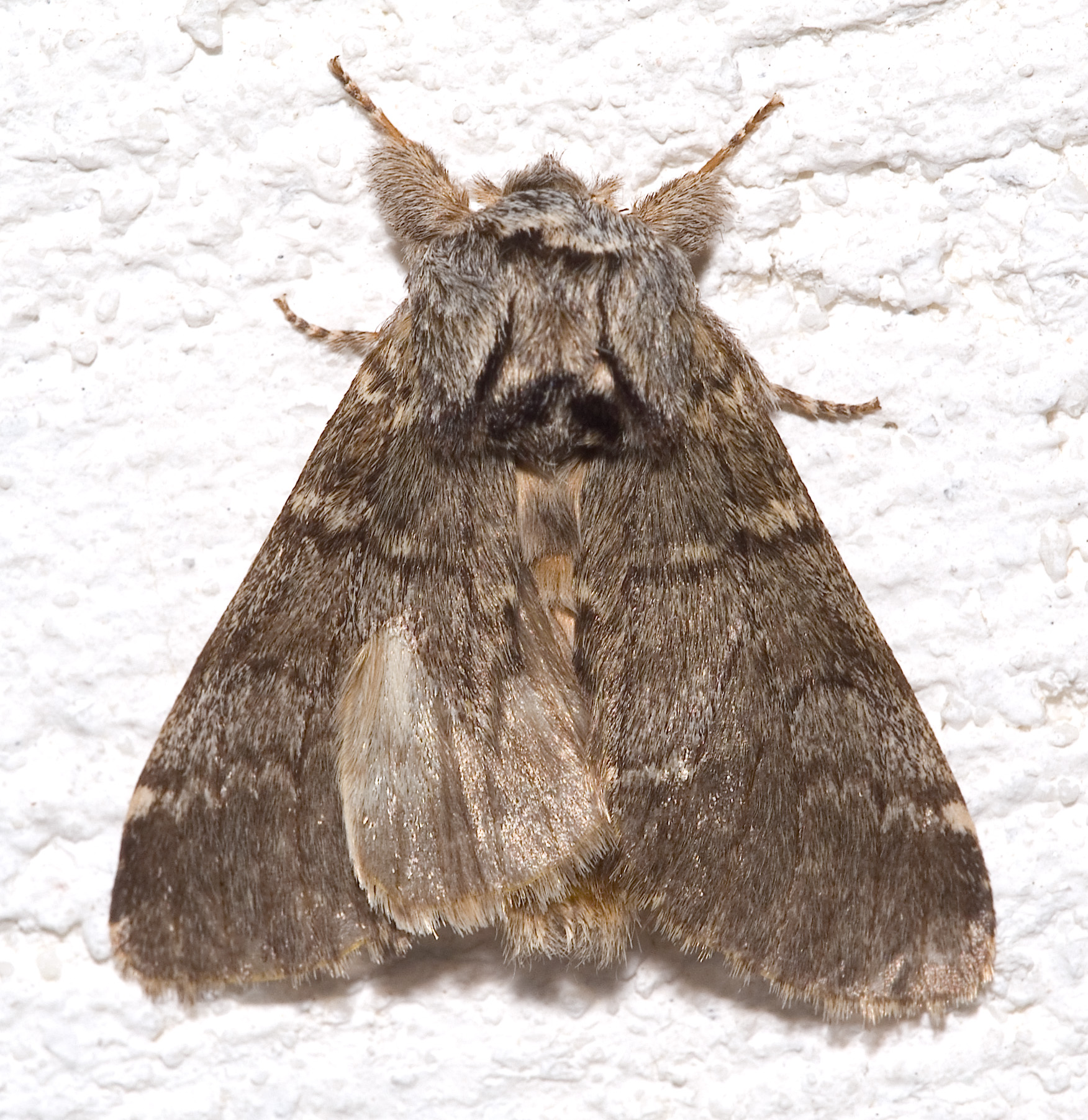

Scientific classification
- Kingdom: Animalia
- Phylum: Arthropoda
- Clade: Pancrustacea
- Class: Insecta
- Order: Lepidoptera
- Superfamily: Noctuoidea
- Family: Notodontidae
- Genus: Drymonia
- Species: D. ruficornis

Binomial name
- Drymonia ruficornis (Hufnagel, 1766)

= Drymonia ruficornis =

Species of moth

Drymonia ruficornis, the lunar marbled brown, is a moth of the family Notodontidae. It is found in Central and Southern Europe and Anatolia.

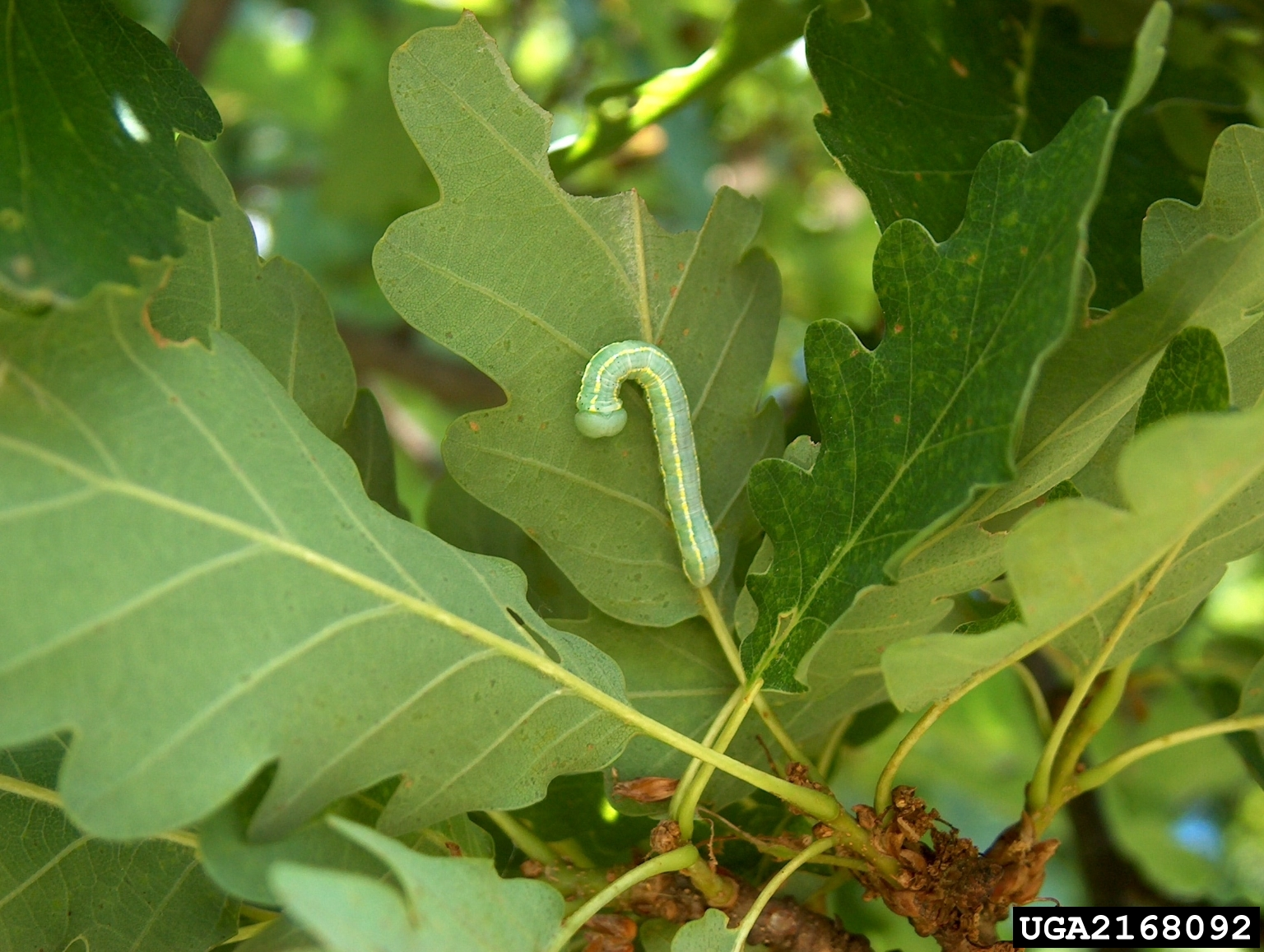
Caterpillar

== Description ==
The wingspan is 35–40 mm. The fore wings are dark fuscous, almost blackish, with a short white line near the base; the central third is white clouded with the ground colour and limited by white edged black wavy lines. There is a black crescent just above the centre of the wing. Hind wings smoky grey with a pale curved line. Drymonia dodonaea is very similar.

== Technical description ==
Thorax greyish brown to light grey, abdomen light. brown. Forewing dark grey-brown, the dark pre-and postdiscal zigzag bands as in querna but closer together, particularly at the hind margin, edged with white on the proximal and distal sides respectively; the median area between the transverse bands paler grey, bearing a sharp black luniform discal spot; in the marginal area a whitish undulate line, which is frequently obsolete. Hindwing light grey-brown. In the southern districts, from southern Central Europe southward, a uniformly darker form predominates, grisea Turati (45e), m which the median area of the forewing is also darkened. Another form, which we call ab.lunula.nov . (45e), is intermediate between grisea and true chaonia [ruficornis]; the whitish colour is restricted to the outer half of the median area beyond the cell and usually interrupted in the centre into a costal and a hindmarginal patch. This aberration likewise belongs to the southern districts. . Egg green. Larva pale green, with 4 equidistant chrome-yellow longitudinal lines, of which the 2 dorsal ones are sometimes whitish, the lateral ones on a level with the black-edged spiracles. Pupa black-brown with lighter segmental incisions; in the ground in a cell lined with silk.

== Biology ==
The moth flies from April to June depending on the location.

The larvae feed on oak.
