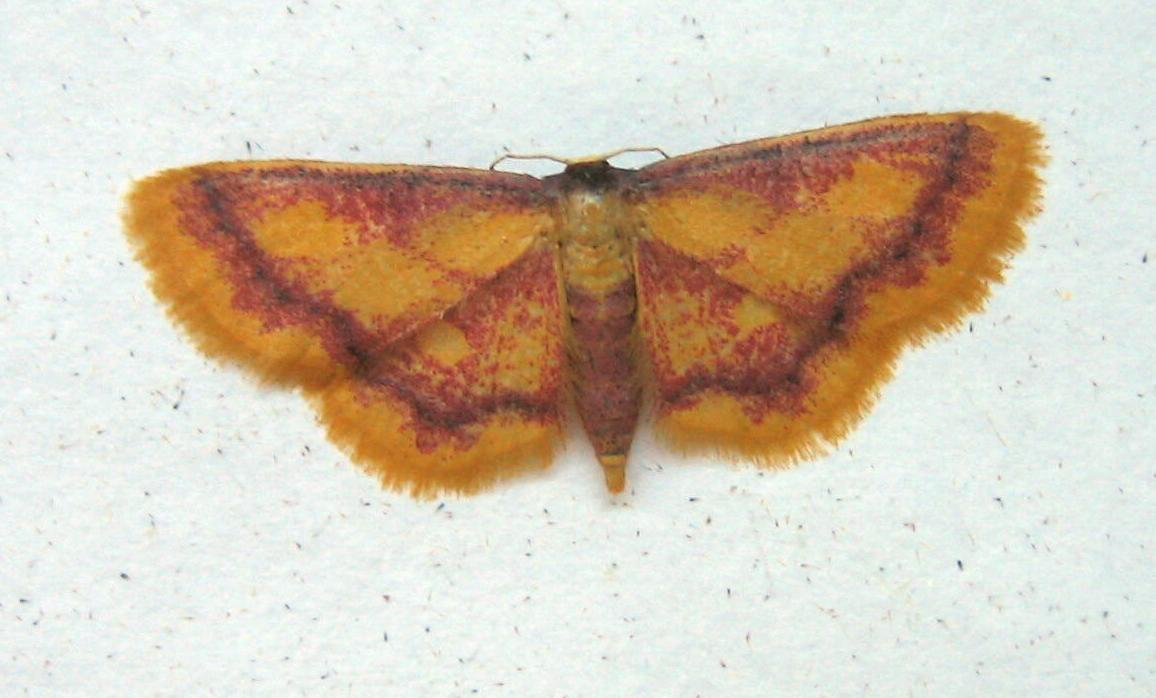

Scientific classification
- Kingdom: Animalia
- Phylum: Arthropoda
- Clade: Pancrustacea
- Class: Insecta
- Order: Lepidoptera
- Family: Geometridae
- Genus: Idaea
- Species: I. muricata

Binomial name
- Idaea muricata (Hufnagel, 1767)

= Idaea muricata =

Purple-bordered gold

Species of moth

Idaea muricata, the purple-bordered gold, is a moth of the family Geometridae. It was first described by Johann Siegfried Hufnagel in 1767 and is found in the Palearctic.

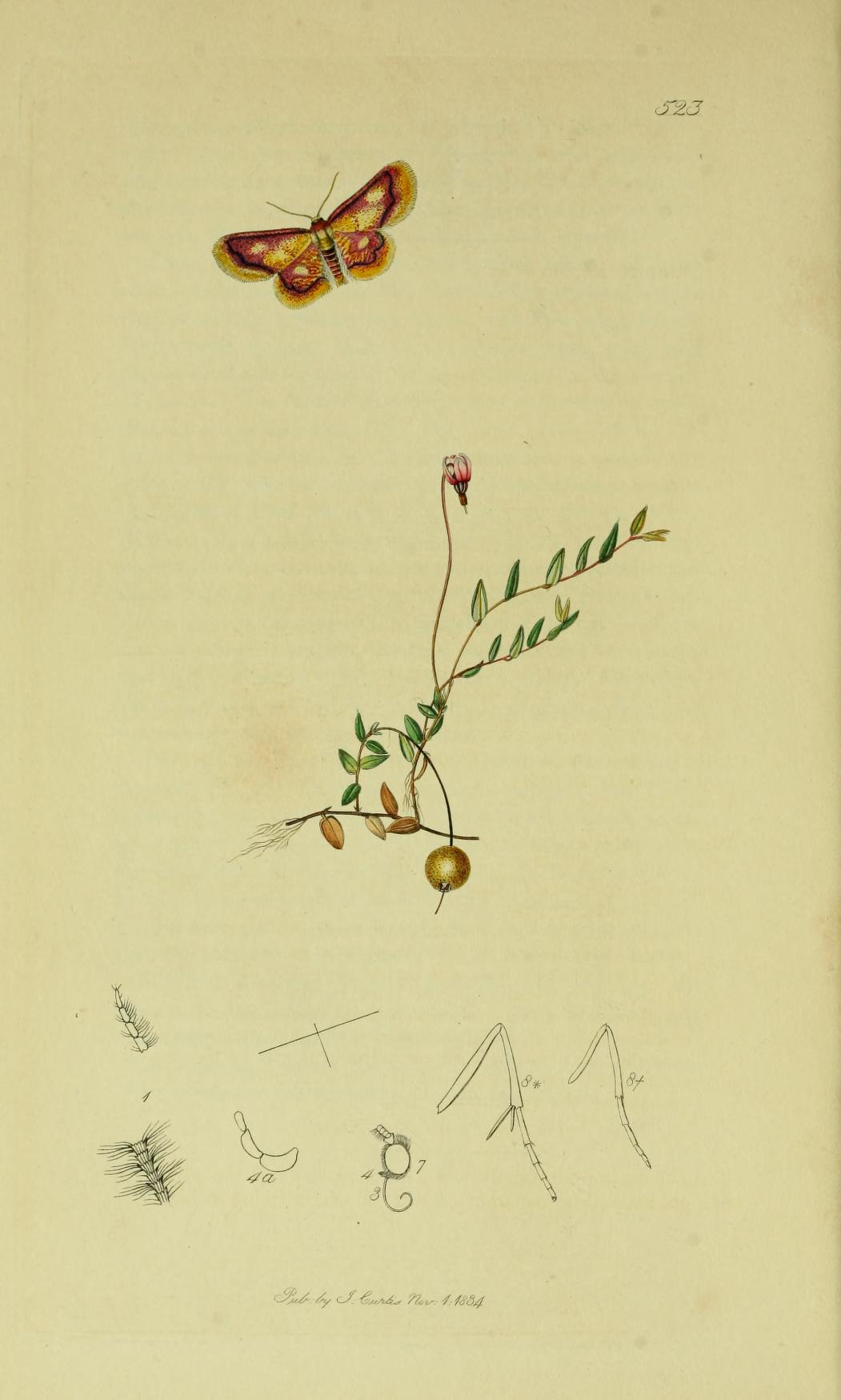
Illustration from John Curtis's British Entomology Volume 6

The species has a wingspan of 18–20 mm. The length of the forewings is 8–10 mm.

== Distribution ==
It is found in western, central and eastern Europe. It occurs in the north to the south of the British Isles, southern Scandinavia and southern Finland. It is known in the western Spanish Pyrenees, Corsica, northern Italy (with occasional occurrences in southern Italy), on the Balkan Peninsula up to Bulgaria and Albania as well as in the foothills of the Caucasus range in the south. To the east of the Urals it extends to the Kuriles (Kunashir) and Japan (northeast tip of Hokkaidō) (subspecies Idaea muricata proutiana (Bryk, 1942)) as well as Korea and China (Sichuan) (species I. muricata minor (Sterneck, 1927)).

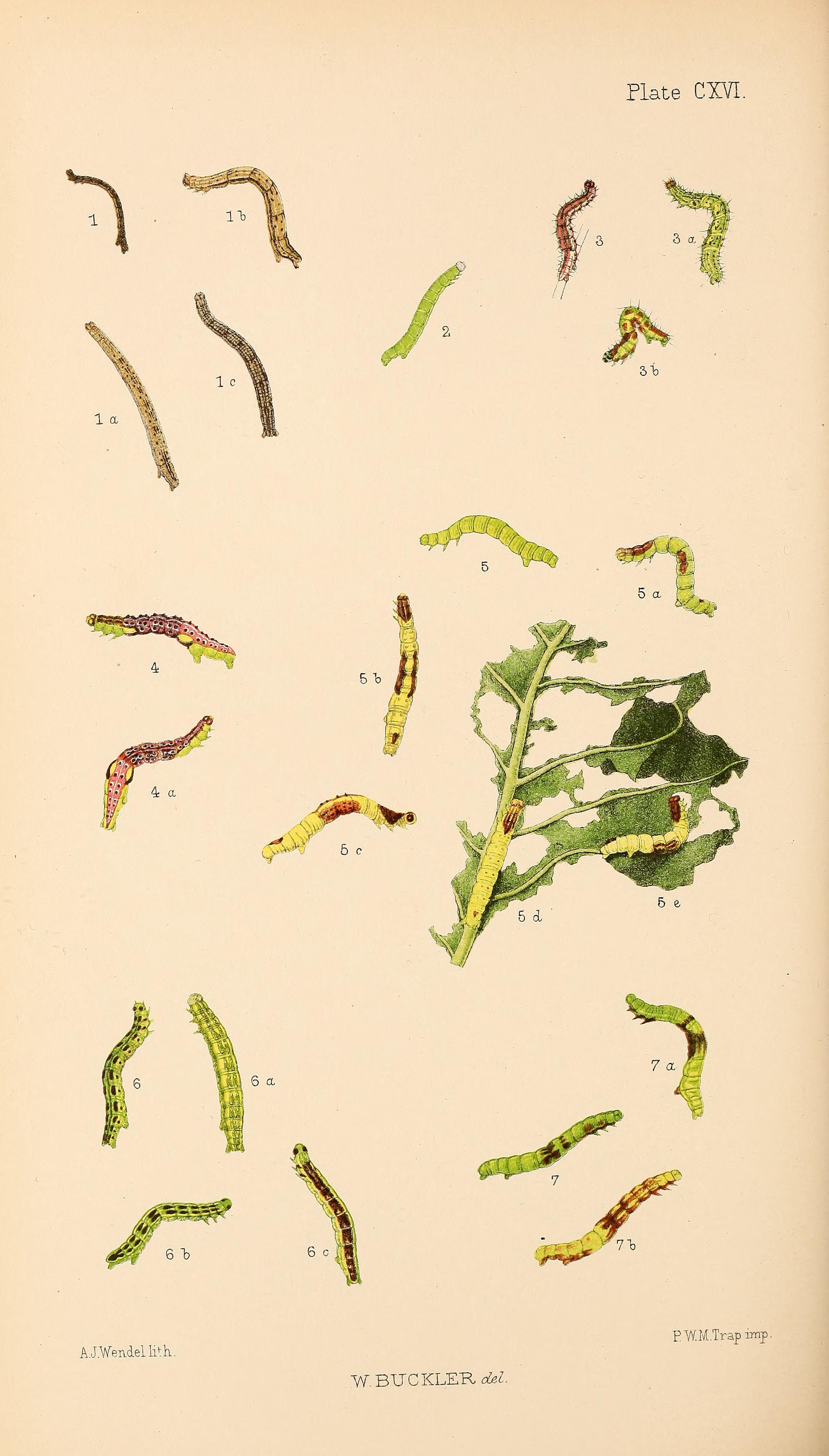
Fig 1,1a,1b,1c Larvae in various stages of growth

== Description ==
The ground colour of the wings is purple. The midfield of the forewing has two yellow spots, a third spot sits at the base of the wing. The pattern is variable. The two midfield spots may be missing, enlarged or fused. The interior crossline is indicated through a slight colour variation. The outer crossline is blue violet, slightly wavy, and very distinctive. The outer crossline is fringed by narrow, jagged purple colour. The margin and fringes are coloured yellow. A large yellow discal spot is located on the hindwing, the midfield is fine yellow spotted.The larva is long and thin, grey-brown with a white side stripe.

== Biology ==
The adults fly at night from June to July.
