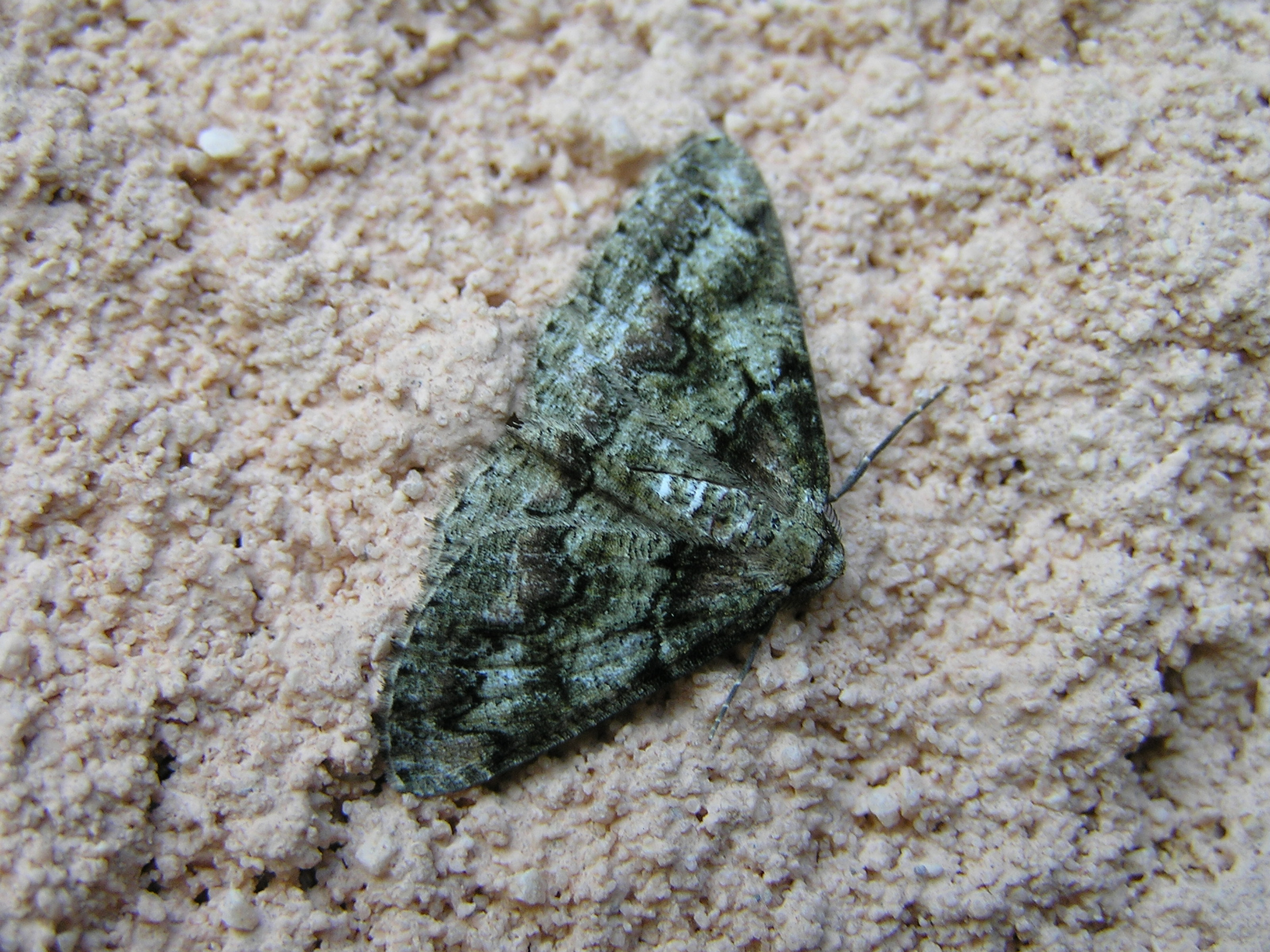

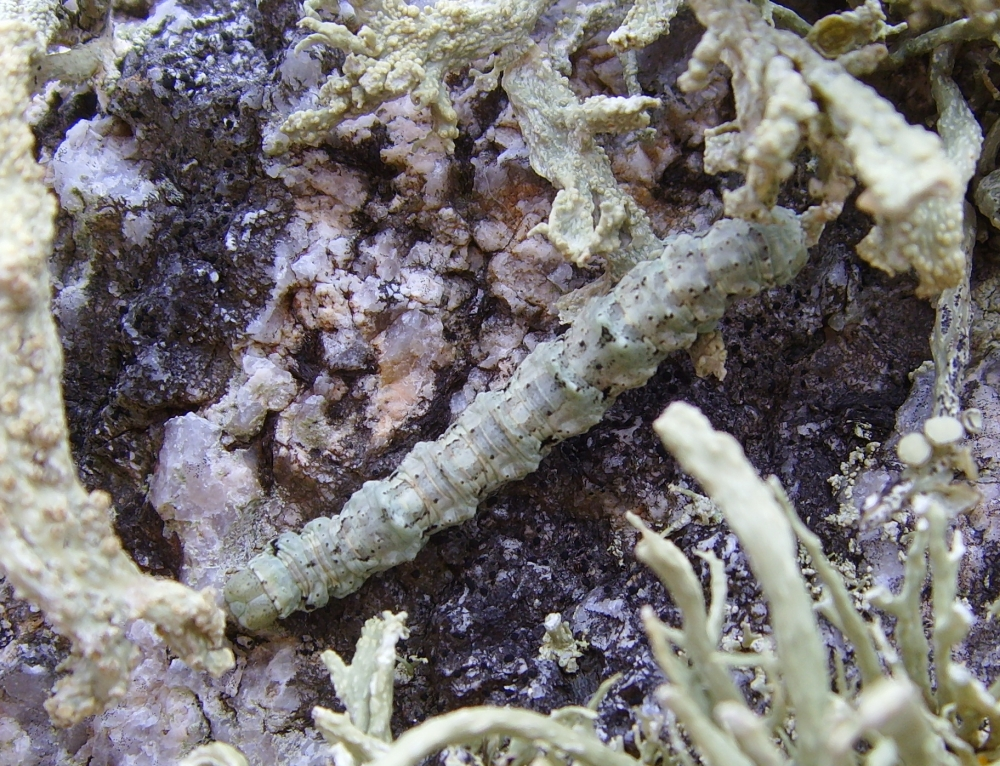

Scientific classification
- Kingdom: Animalia
- Phylum: Arthropoda
- Clade: Pancrustacea
- Class: Insecta
- Order: Lepidoptera
- Family: Geometridae
- Genus: Cleorodes; Warren, 1894
- Species: C. lichenaria

Binomial name
- Cleorodes lichenaria (Hufnagel, 1767)

Synonyms
- Phalaena lichenaria Hufnagel, 1767

= Cleorodes =

Genus of moths

Cleorodes is a monotypic genus of moth in the family Geometridae described by Warren in 1894. Its single species, Cleorodes lichenaria, the Brussels lace, was first described by Johann Siegfried Hufnagel in 1767.

The species can be found in Europe, the Taurus and Transcaucasia.

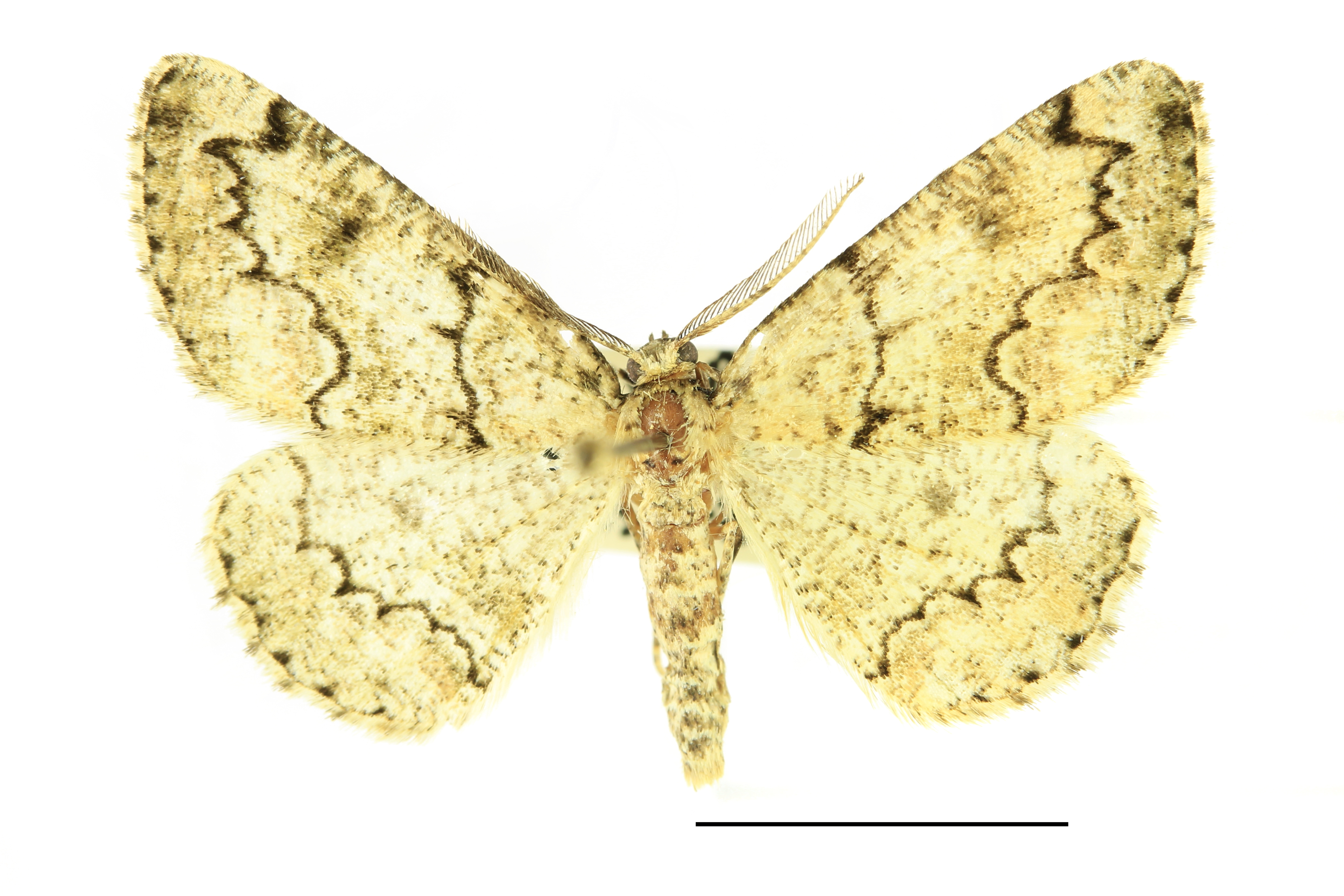

The wingspan is 31–38 mm. The length of the forewings is 14–18 mm. The grey forewings only show a greenish tint when the moth is newly hatched – this very quickly fades into a pale brown tint (a medium shade is mostly missing). The forewings are dark dusted. The fringes are black and white patched. There are two black cross lines. The outer cross line is characteristically shaped. A strongly serrated black cross line is located on the rear wings. The hindwing margin contains a few black, crescent-shaped lines. The antennae of the males are heavily combed on both sides, those of the females are filiform. The larva has dorsal humps on the abdominal segments. It is greenish grey with blackish markings, beautifully assimilated to the tree-lichens on which it feeds. The pupa is slender, deep red brown, in a slight network cocoon among the lichen.

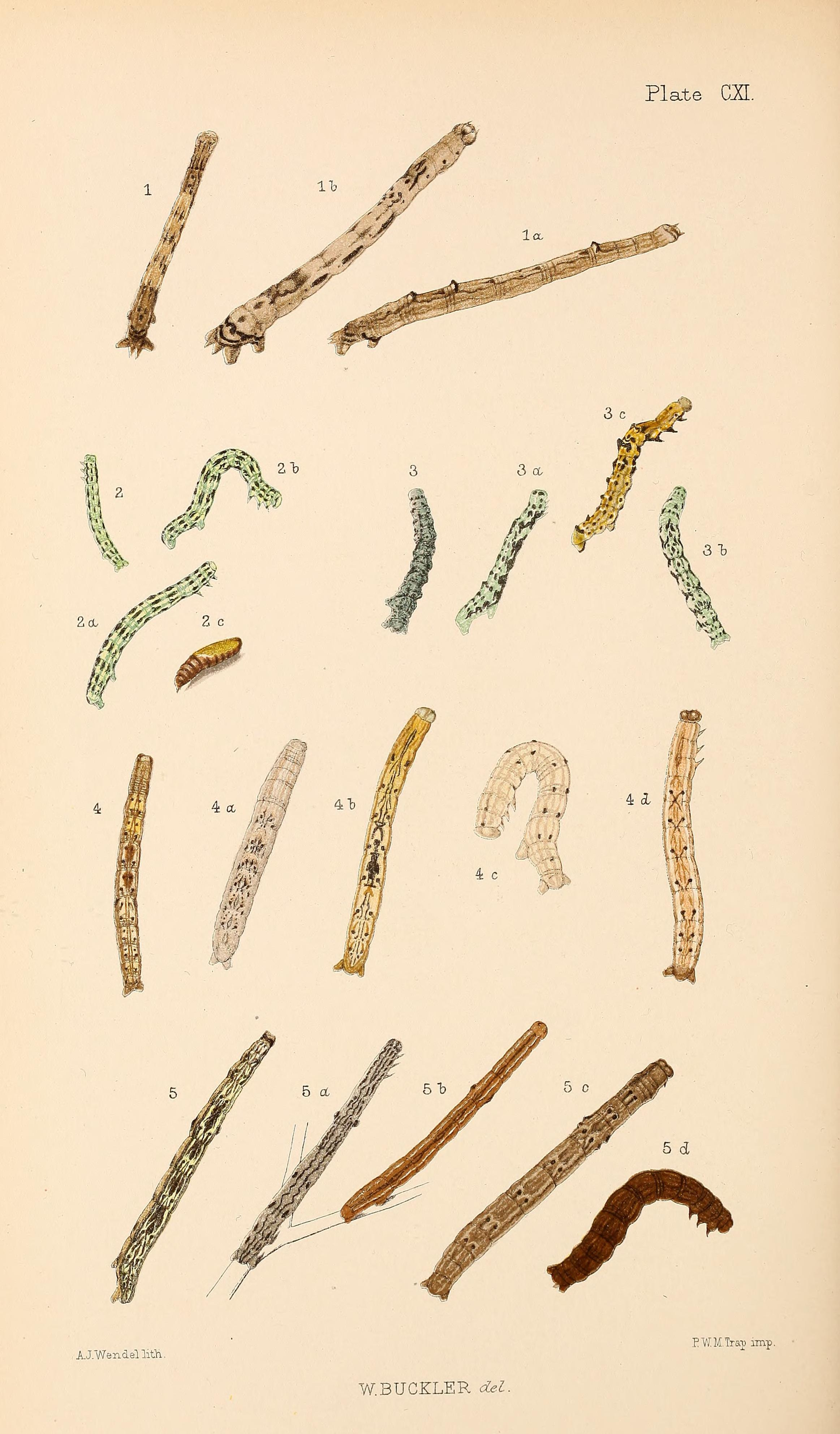
Figs.,3a,3b,3c Larvae in various stages

The moths fly in one generation from June to August..

The larvae feed on lichens. The larva hibernates.

== Notes ==
1. The flight season refers to Belgium and the Netherlands. This may vary in other parts of the range.
