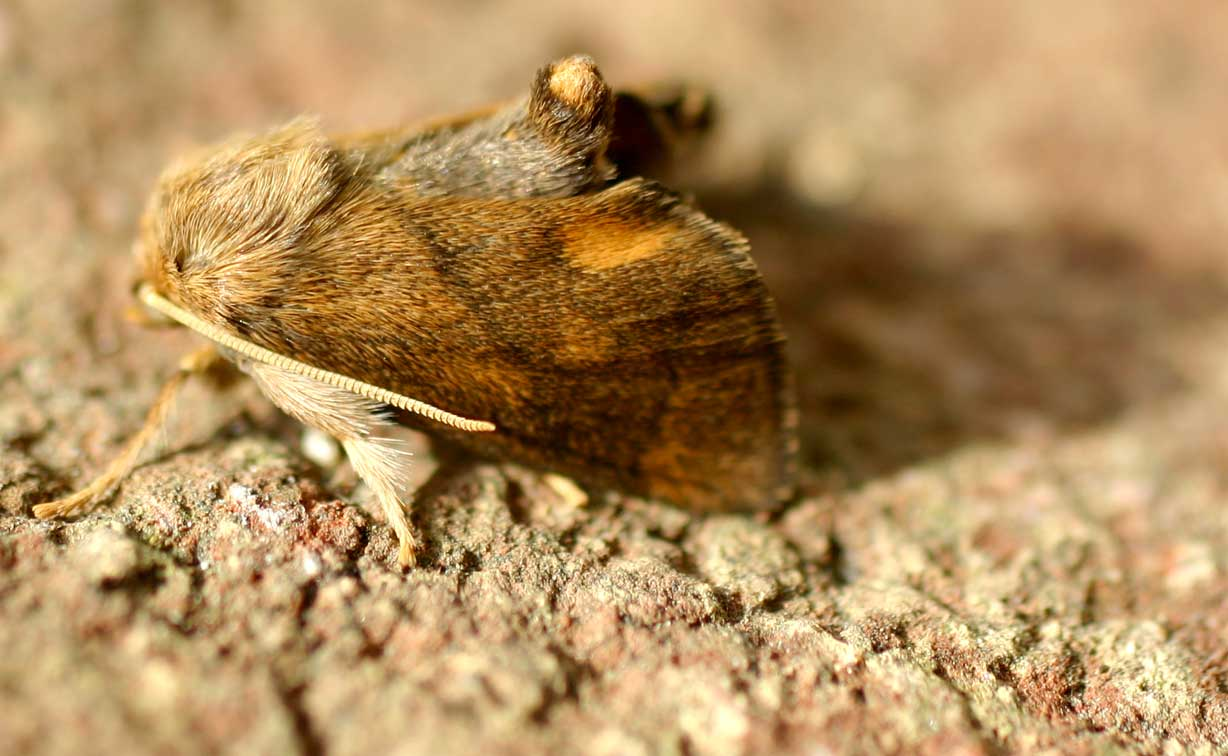
- adult
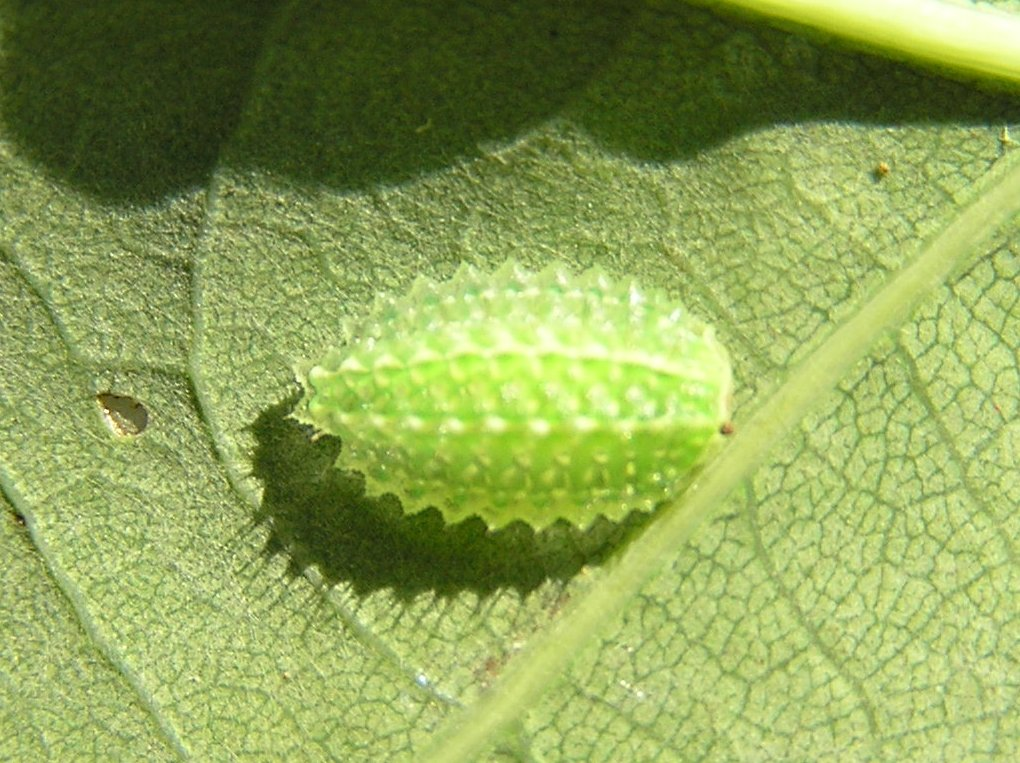
- caterpillar

Scientific classification
- Kingdom: Animalia
- Phylum: Arthropoda
- Class: Insecta
- Order: Lepidoptera
- Family: Limacodidae
- Genus: Apoda
- Species: A. limacodes

Binomial name
- Apoda limacodes (Hufnagel, 1766)

= Apoda limacodes =

Species of moth

Apoda limacodes, also known as the festoon, is a species of moth of the family Limacodidae.

== Distribution ==
The moth is found in most of Europe. Within Great Britain, the species is scarce.

== Description ==
Adults have a wingspan of 24–28 mm, with male specimens generally slightly smaller and darker than females. It is primarily nocturnal, but it will occasionally fly in the daytime. The moth usually flies between June and July.

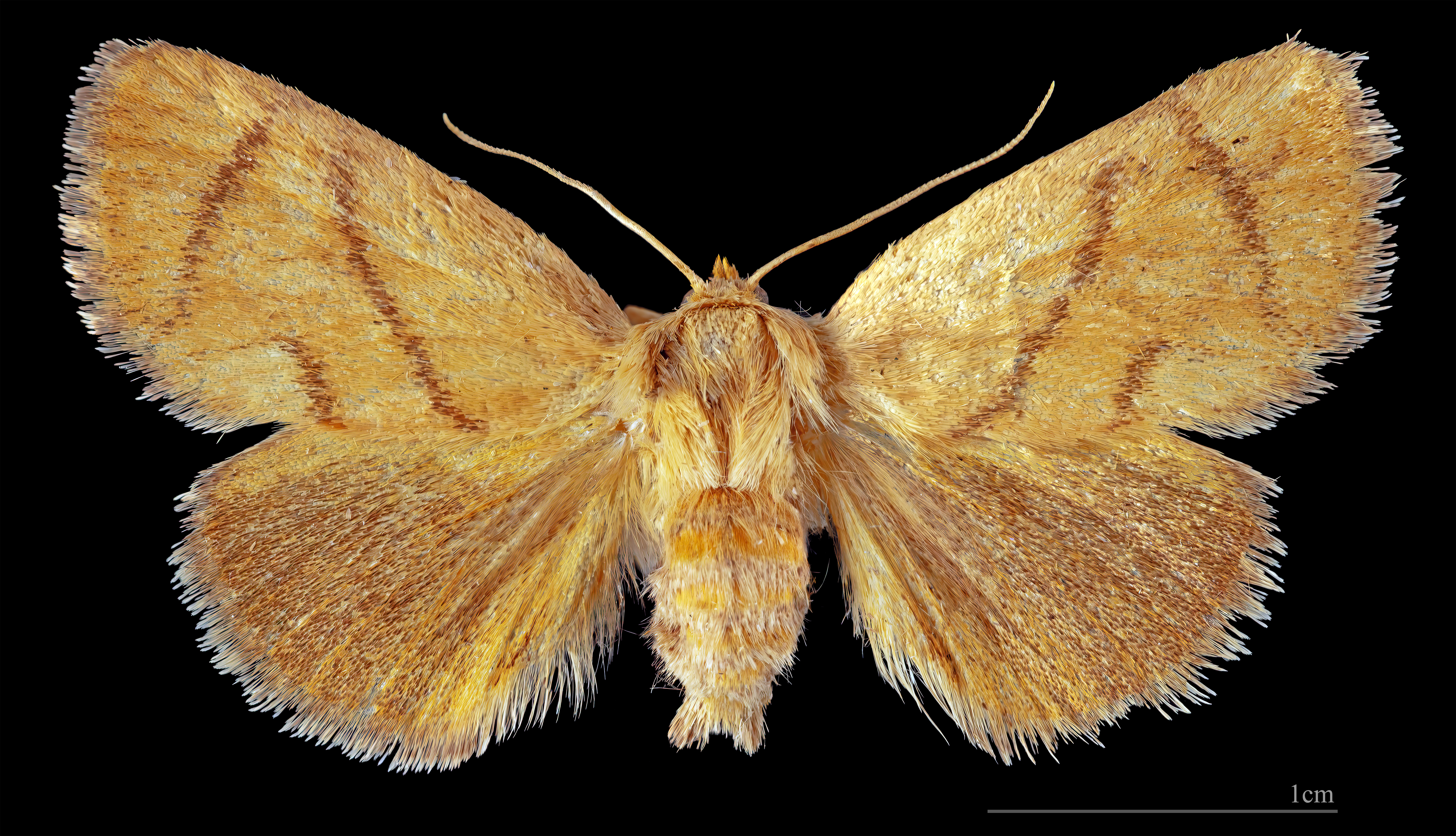
♂

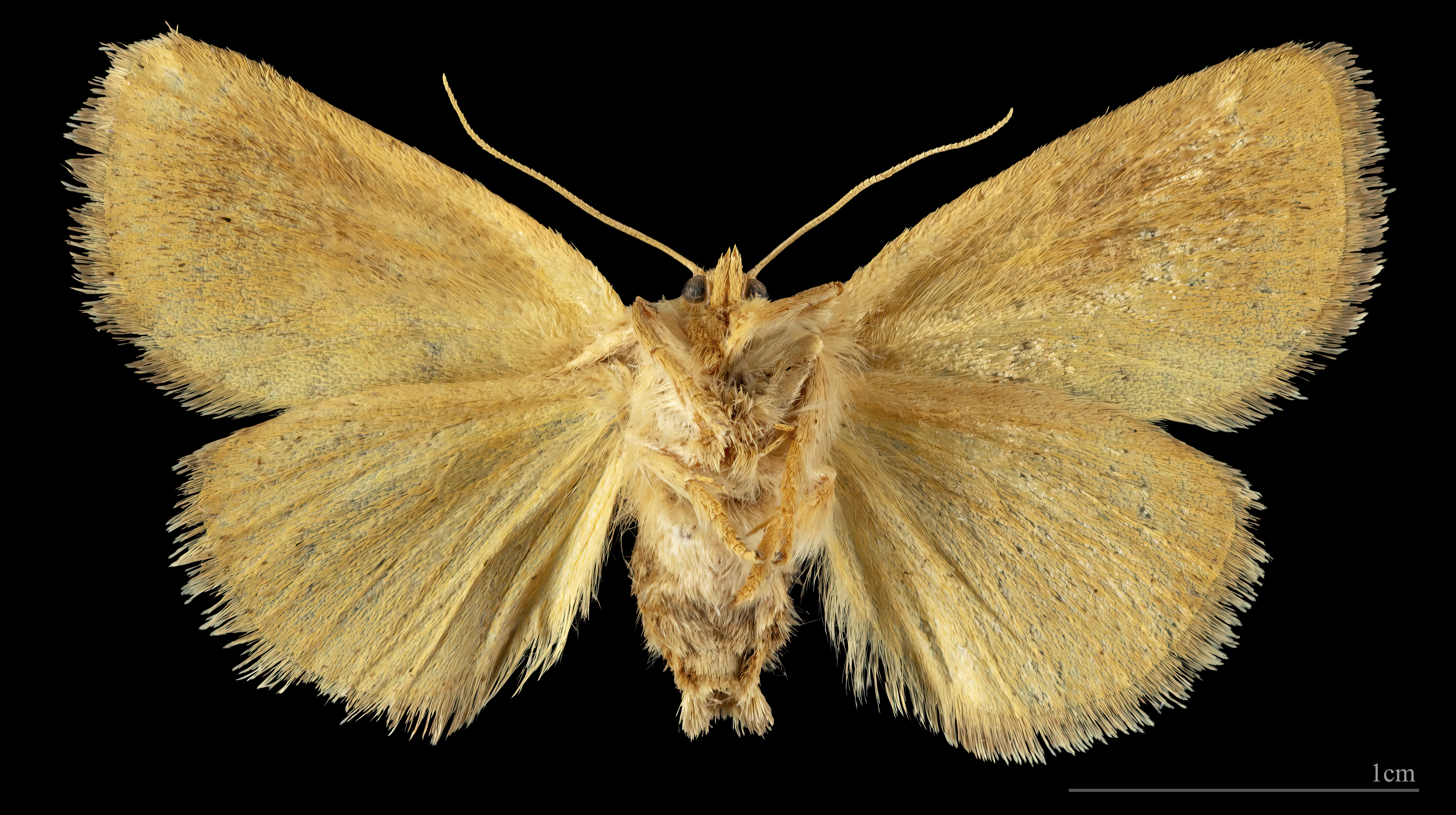
♂ △

== Biology ==
The festoon mainly inhabits thick woodlands. The larvae are known to feed on oak and beech.

Life cycle and behaviour The larva is small and grub-like. After storms, caterpillars are often observed in large numbers between August and October. Cocoons are not attached, but overwinter and pupate in the spring.
