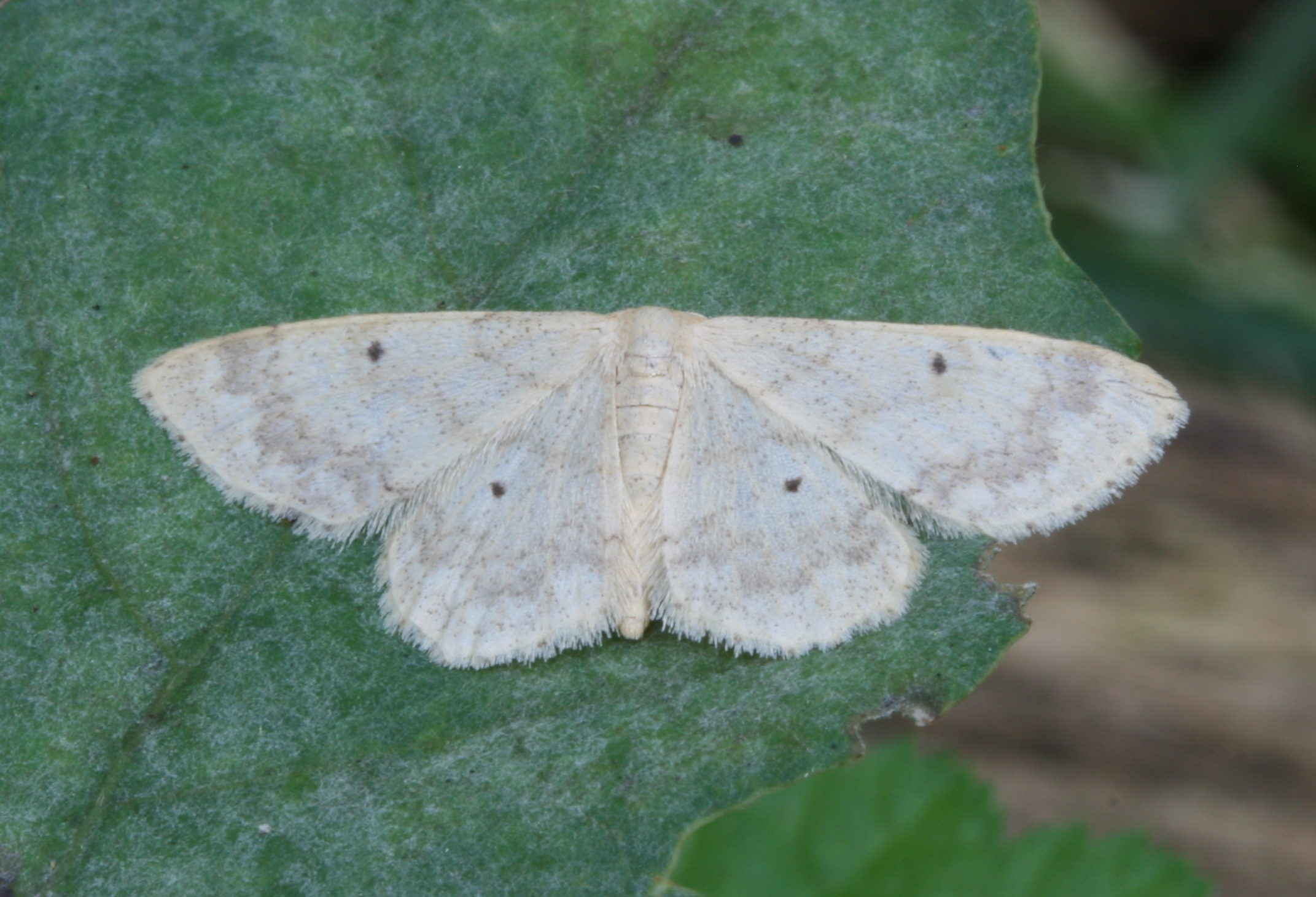

Scientific classification
- Domain: Eukaryota
- Kingdom: Animalia
- Phylum: Arthropoda
- Class: Insecta
- Order: Lepidoptera
- Family: Geometridae
- Genus: Idaea
- Species: I. biselata

Binomial name
- Idaea biselata (Hufnagel, 1767)

= Small fan-footed wave =

Species of moth

The small fan-footed wave (Idaea biselata) is a moth of the family Geometridae. The species was first described by Johann Siegfried Hufnagel in 1767.

== Distribution ==
The species is widespread from the British Isles across western Europe and east to the Urals. In northern Europe, the range extends about to central Fennoscandia. In the south the range extends up to central Portugal, Corsica, the northern Apennines and northern Greece. Isolated occurrences are known from Calabria and the Peloponnese. Outside of Europe it is found in the Caucasus, Transcaucasia, in the north of Turkey, in Siberia, in northern Kazakhstan, as well as in the Russian Far East. The subspecies Idaea biselata extincta (Staudinger, 1897) is represented in Korea and the Ussuri region. It rises to about 1,700 metres above sea level in the Alps. South of the Alps, is found from 600 to 1,500 metres and is rarely found below this range.

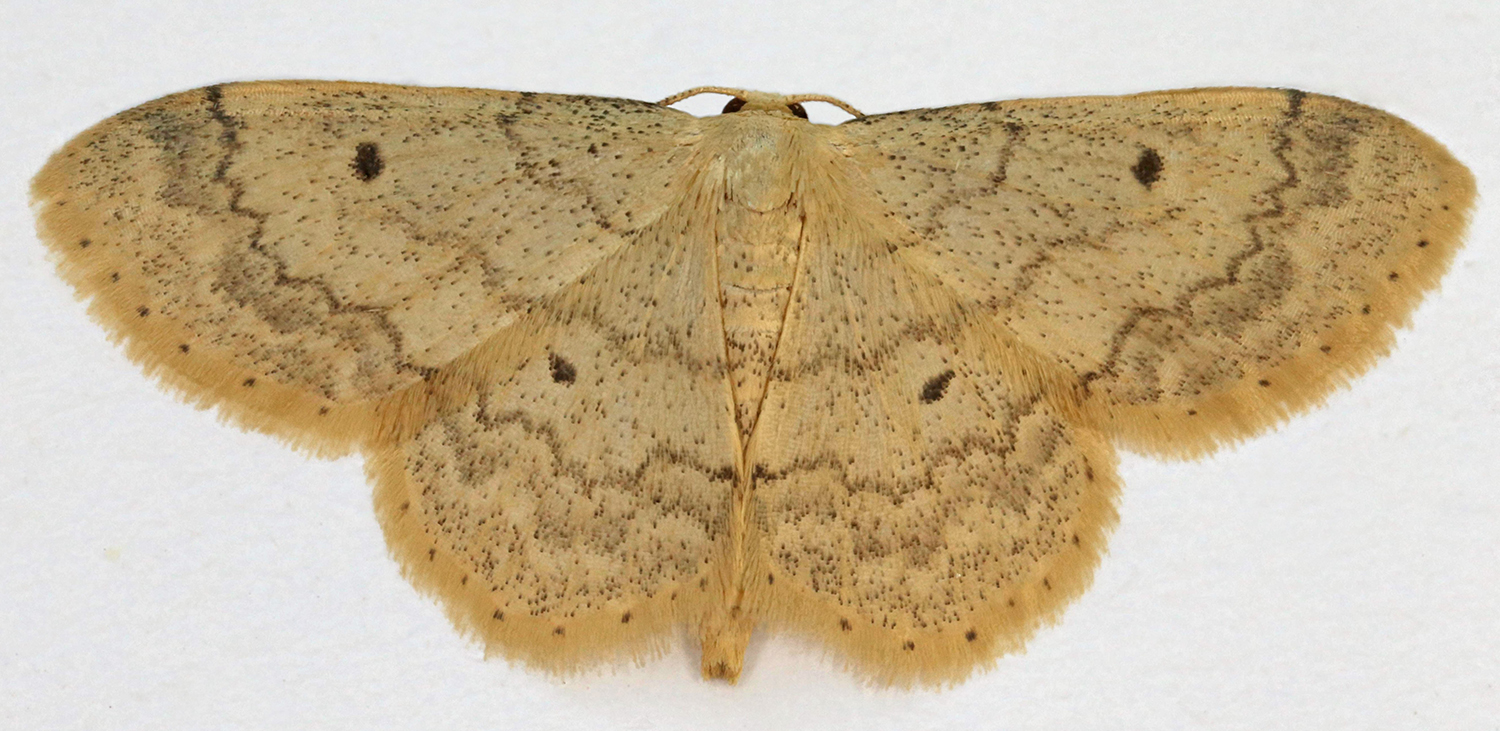
Small Fan-footed Wave, Dovey Forest, North Wales

== Description ==
It is a small (wingspan 22–25 mm), easily missed species. The wings are creamy white with darker bands with a small black discal spot on each wing. The basic colouring and pattern vary relatively little. The ground colour is yellowish white to slightly brownish white, the pattern elements are brown to dark brown. On the forewings the interior crossline is the most clearly shown. However, the outer crossline is usually significantly developed. A pale wavy line that is lined with inner and outer darker colour is located in the marginal field. Forewings and hindwings have black discal spots. On the front wings, these are basal to the middle crossline, on the rear wings they are distal to the interior crossline. Marginal stains are dark brown in colour, but dimly developed. The larva is long and thin, with a few short setae, brownish grey with a white side stripe.

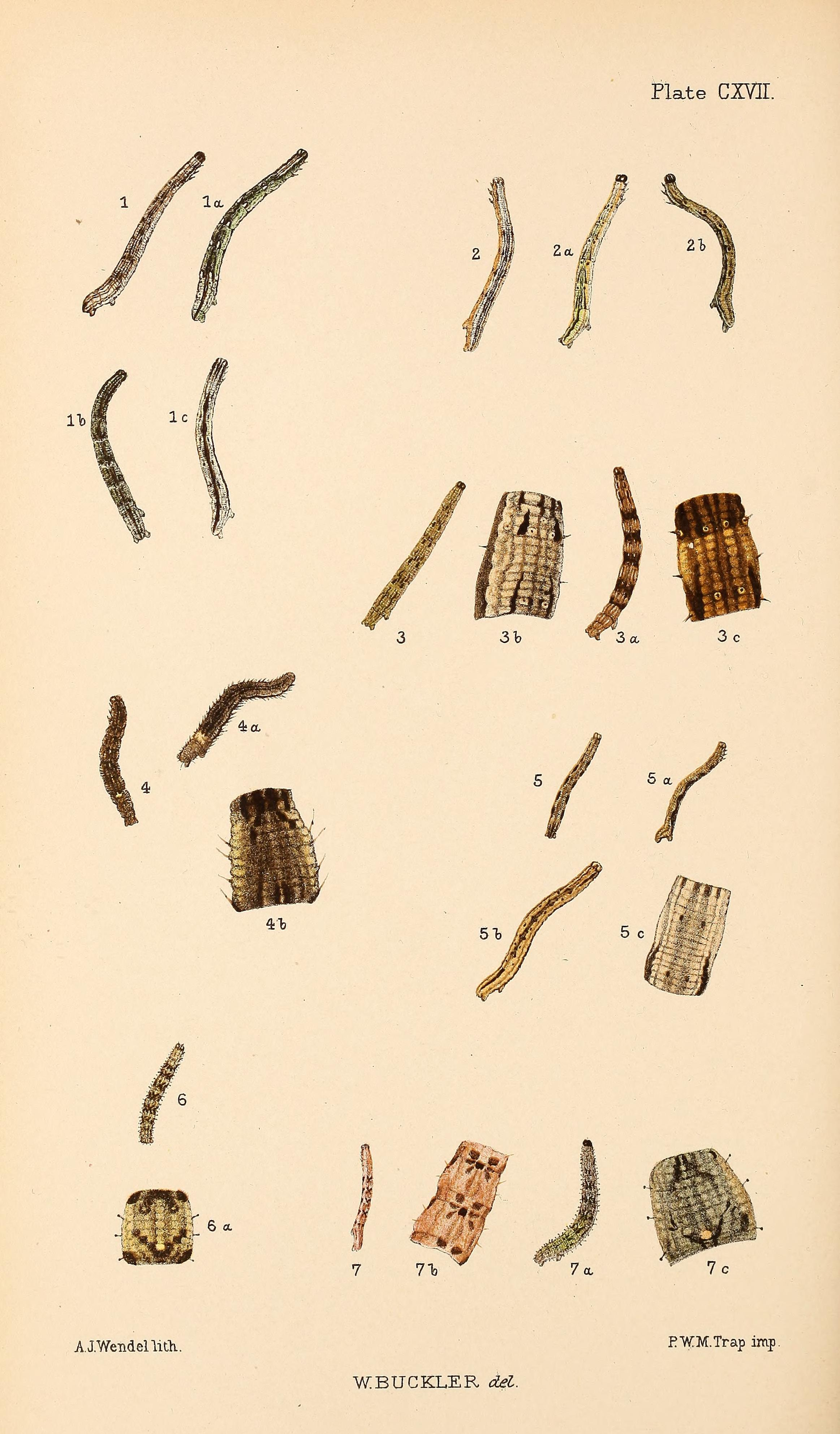
3,3a Larvae after final moult 3b,3c enlarged view of segments

== Biology ==
It sometimes flies short distances by day but mainly at night when it is attracted to light. The adults are on the wing from June to August.

The larva feeds on a variety of plants including asparagus, dandelion, knotgrass, oak, plantain and Rubus. The species overwinters as a larva.

1. The flight season refers to the British Isles. This may vary in other parts of the range.
