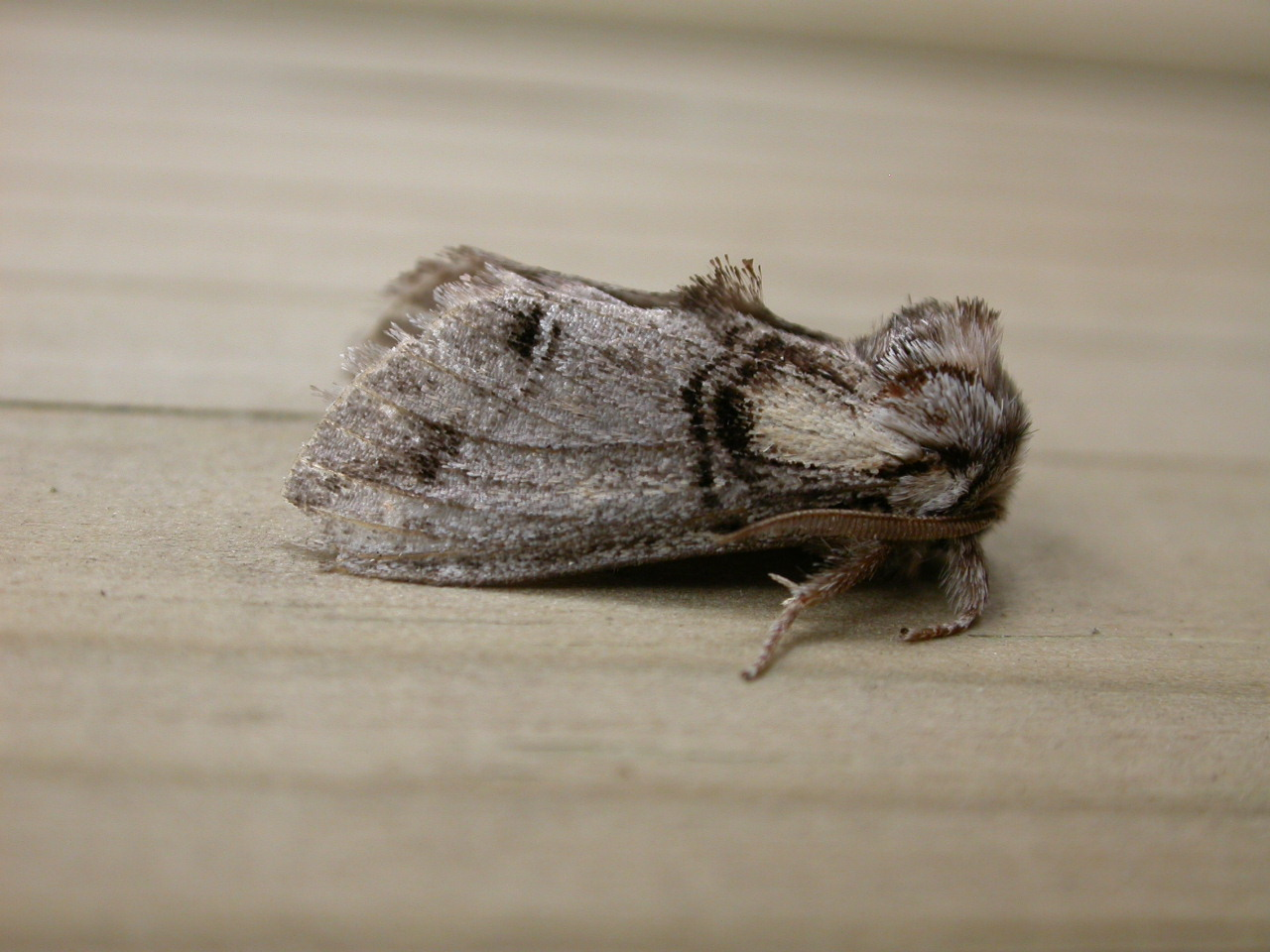

Scientific classification
- Kingdom: Animalia
- Phylum: Arthropoda
- Clade: Pancrustacea
- Class: Insecta
- Order: Lepidoptera
- Superfamily: Noctuoidea
- Family: Notodontidae
- Genus: Drymonia
- Species: D. velitaris

Binomial name
- Drymonia velitaris (Hufnagel, 1766)

= Drymonia velitaris =

Species of moth

Drymonia velitaris is a moth of the family Notodontidae first described by Johann Siegfried Hufnagel in 1766. It is found in central and southern Europe and Anatolia.

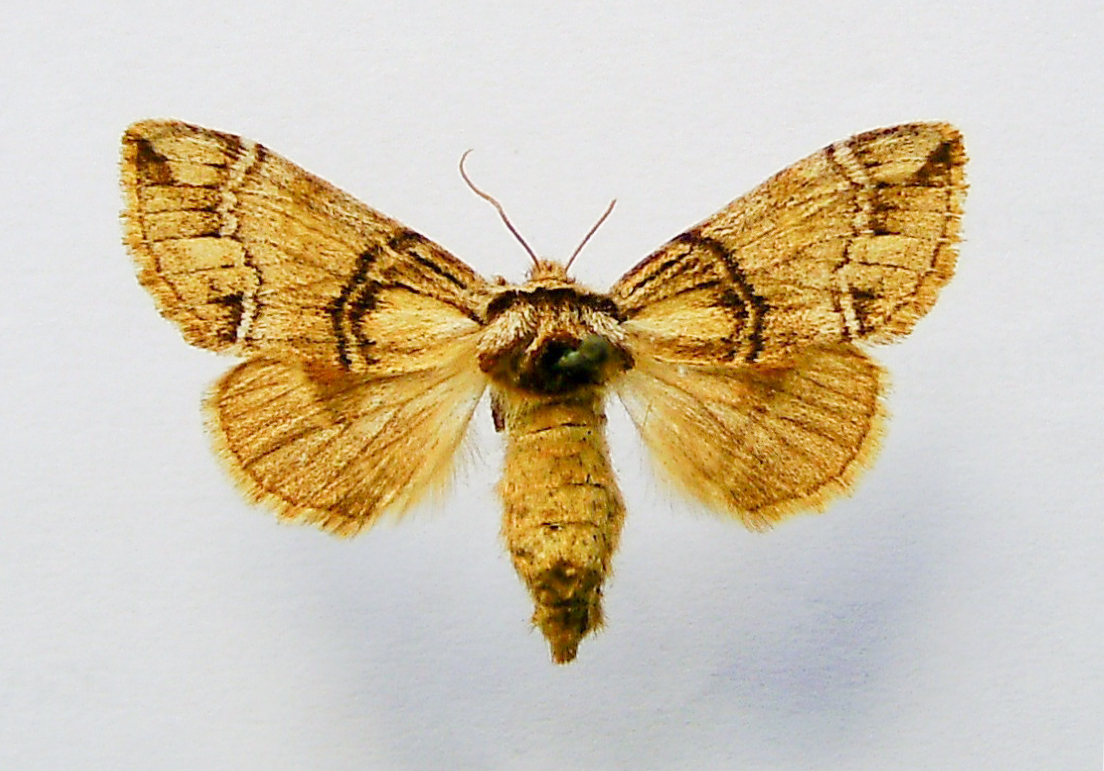
Mounted female

The length of the forewings is 12–15 mm for males and 15–18 mm for females.
