= Apoda =

Apoda may refer to:

- Apoda (genus), a genus of moths in the family Limacodidae
- Caecilian, a group of limbless, serpentine amphibians
- Greater bird-of-paradise (Paradisaea apoda)
