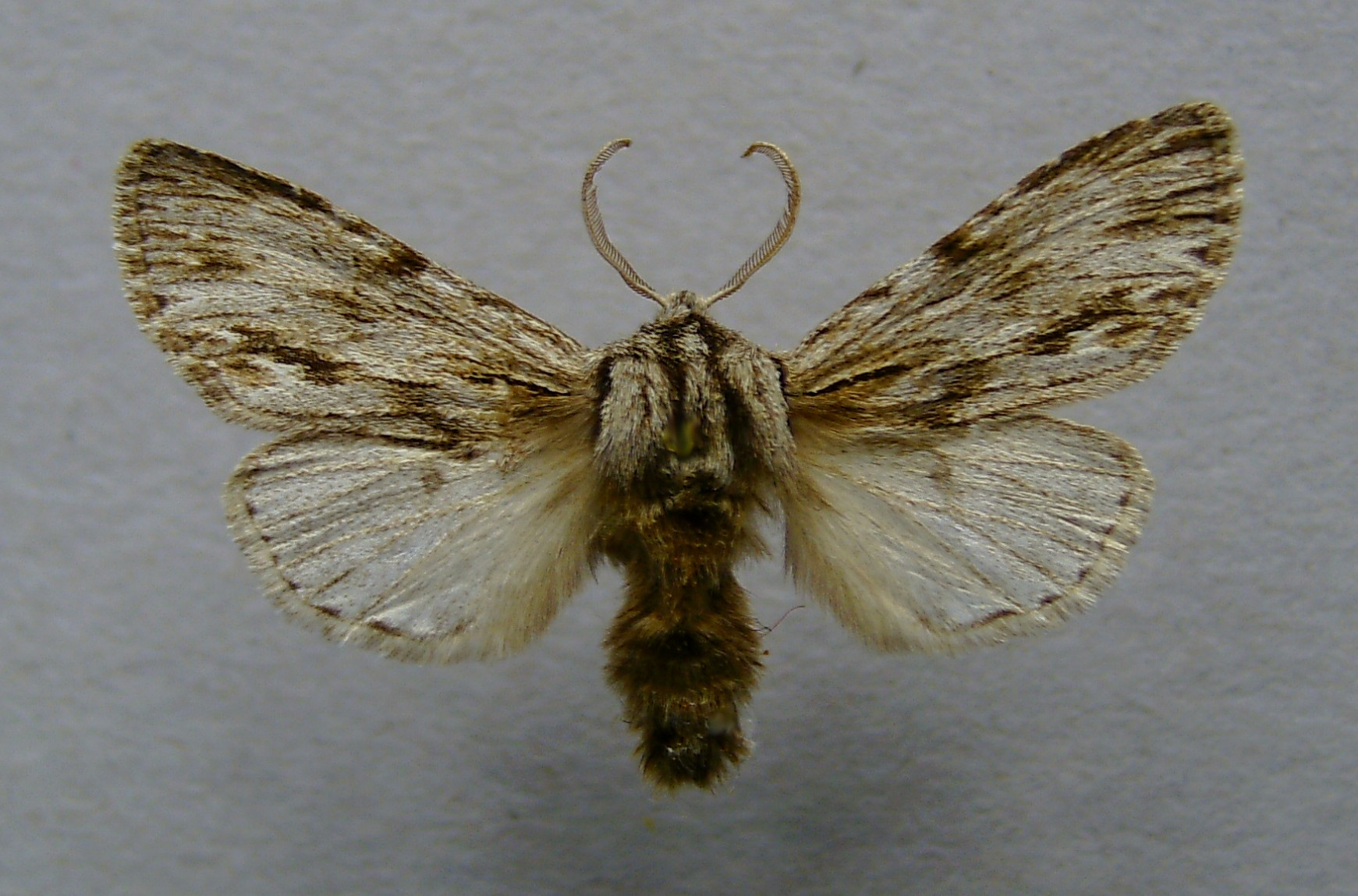

Scientific classification
- Kingdom: Animalia
- Phylum: Arthropoda
- Class: Insecta
- Order: Lepidoptera
- Superfamily: Noctuoidea
- Family: Noctuidae
- Genus: Asteroscopus
- Species: A. sphinx

Binomial name
- Asteroscopus sphinx (Hufnagel, 1766)

= Asteroscopus sphinx =

Sprawler

Species of moth

Asteroscopus sphinx, the sprawler, is a moth in the family Noctuidae. It is found throughout western Europe, but is mainly a northern species occurring south to northern Spain, the southern edge of the Alps, Central Italy, and Northern Greece. In the northwest, it occurs throughout England and Wales, but is rare in Ireland; and then east through southern Sweden, to Kaliningrad and Moscow, and also in Central Europe, Turkey, the Caucasus and Asia Minor.

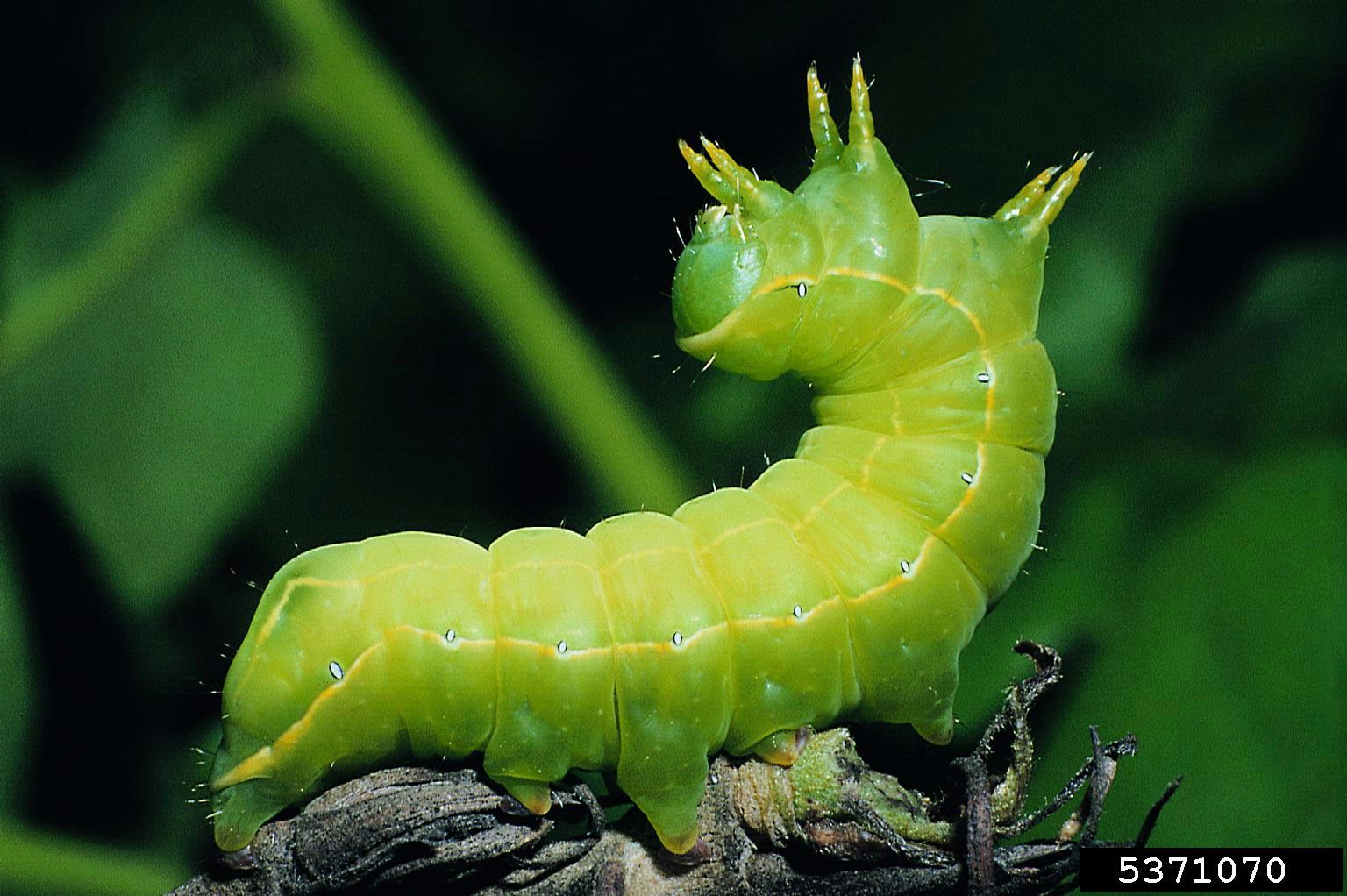
Larva

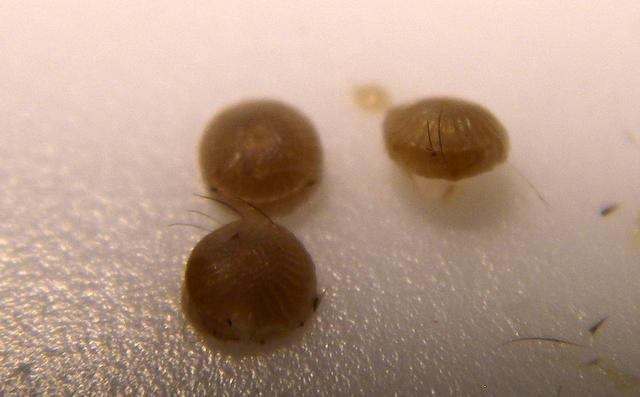
Eggs

== Description ==
The wingspan is 39–49 mm. The length of the forewings is 17–22 mm. "Forewing pale luteous grey, more or less strongly dusted with olive grey: a thick black streak from base below cell, with a finer streak above and beyond it, and another beyond it below submedian fold; outer line marked by black vein dashes on a paler space; orbicular stigma flattened, elongate, edged with black; reniform large irregularly 8-shaped, the lower half angled and reaching below median vein: submarginal line pale, preceded by black wedgeshaped marks between veins and followed by black streaks from termen in the intervals, the indentation on submedian fold more strongly marked; veins towards margin finely black; fringe chequered pale and dark grey; hindwing whitish, grey-speckled, the veins darker: a dull grey cellspot, and marginal row of black lunules; the female is darker throughout, more brownish tinged."

== Biology ==
The moth flies in one generation in from early September to November.

The larva is bright velvety green; dorsal and subdorsal lines chalk white, the latter commencing only at segment 4; spiracular line yellowish white, with dark upper edge; face green with two yellow streaks. The larvae feed on various deciduous trees and shrubs, such as Corylus avellana, Quercus, Fraxinus excelsior and Salix.

Habitats include deciduous and mixed forests, but also such as hedges, gardens, to parks and avenues.

== Notes ==
1. The flight season refers to Belgium and The Netherlands. This may vary in other parts of the range.
