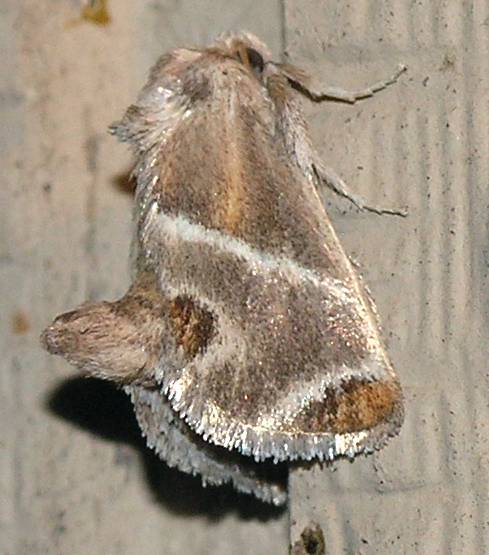

Scientific classification
- Domain: Eukaryota
- Kingdom: Animalia
- Phylum: Arthropoda
- Class: Insecta
- Order: Lepidoptera
- Family: Limacodidae
- Genus: Apoda
- Species: A. biguttata

Binomial name
- Apoda biguttata (Packard, 1864)

Synonyms
- Apoda tetraspilaris Walker, 1865

= Apoda biguttata =

Species of moth

Apoda biguttata, the shagreened slug moth, is a moth of the family Limacodidae. It is found in eastern North America.

The wingspan is 19–30 mm. The moth flies from April to August.

The larvae feed on various deciduous trees, including hornbeam, hickory and oak.
