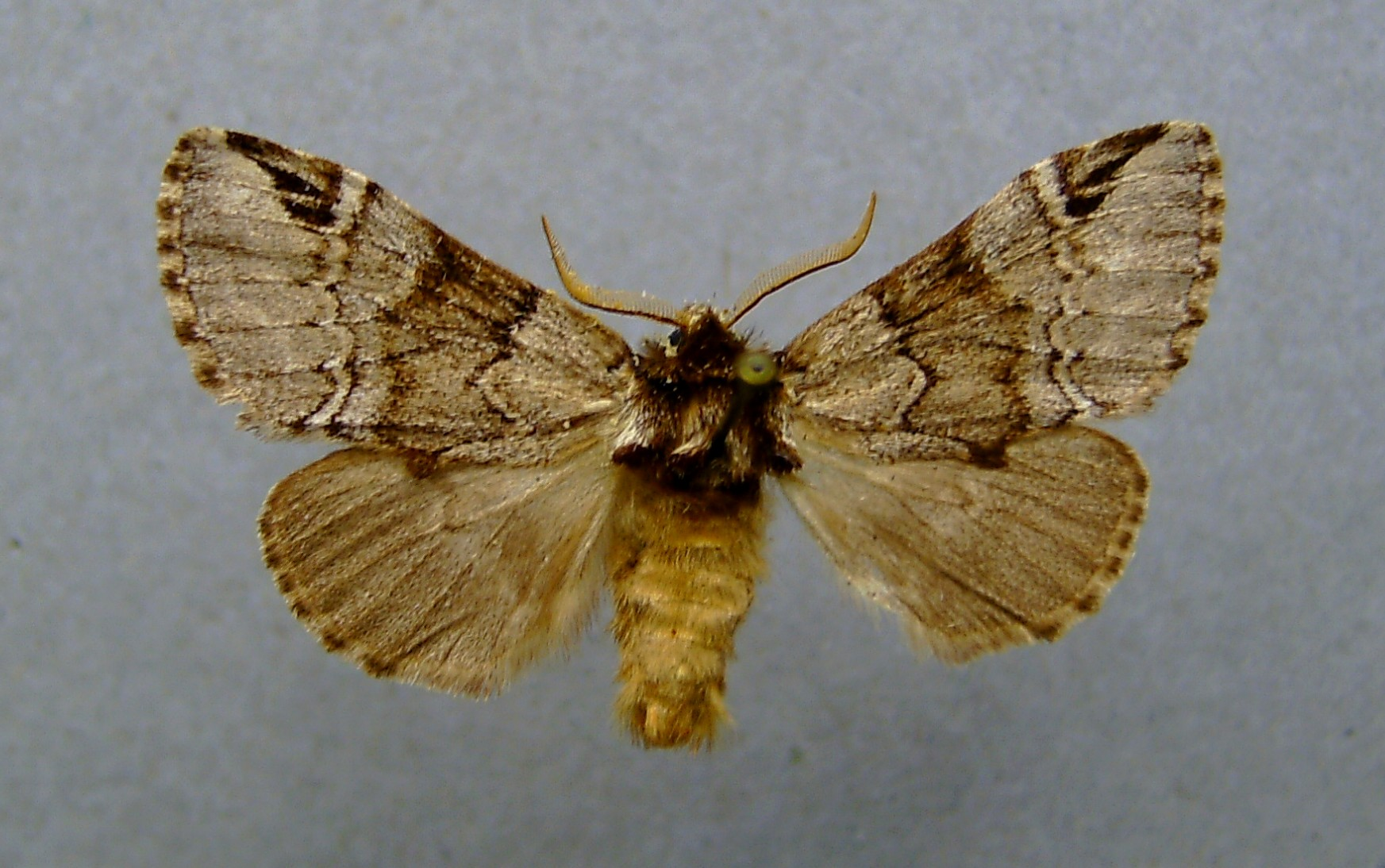

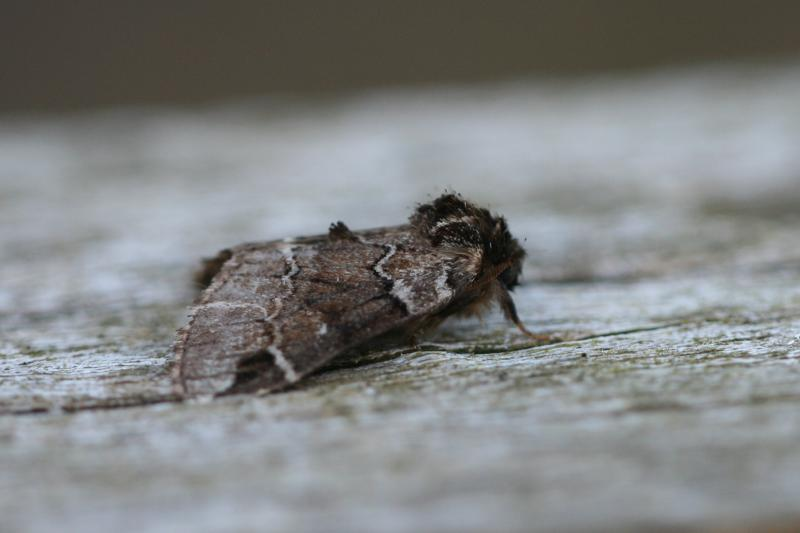

Scientific classification
- Kingdom: Animalia
- Phylum: Arthropoda
- Clade: Pancrustacea
- Class: Insecta
- Order: Lepidoptera
- Superfamily: Noctuoidea
- Family: Notodontidae
- Genus: Drymonia
- Species: D. obliterata

Binomial name
- Drymonia obliterata (Esper, 1785)

Synonyms
- Drymonia melagona; Ochrostigma melagona

= Drymonia obliterata =

Indistinct marbled brown

Species of moth

Drymonia obliterata, the indistinct marbled brown, is a moth of the family Notodontidae. It is found in Central and Southern Europe, Asia Minor and Armenia.

The wingspan is 30–40 mm. The moth flies from May to July and in warmer regions also from August to September.

The larvae feed on Quercus, Fagus and Betula species.

== Subspecies ==
There are two recognised subspecies:

- Drymonia obliterata obliterata
- Drymonia obliterata esmera
