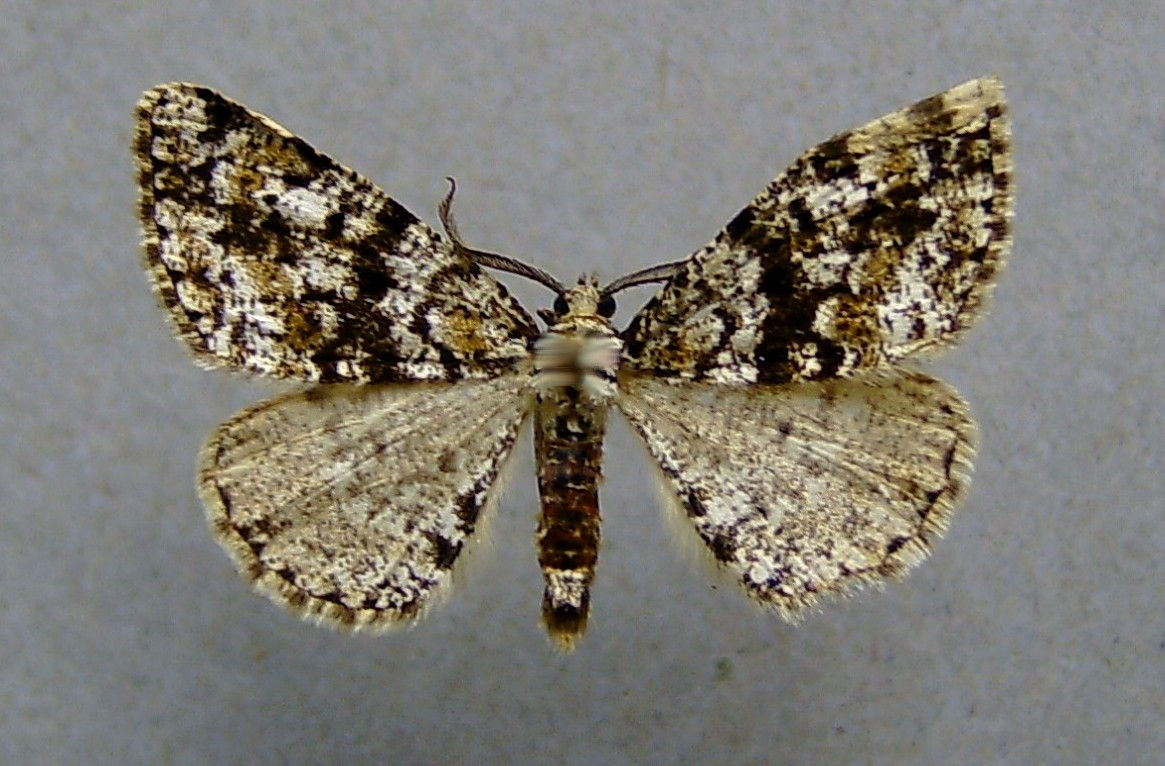
- Fagivorina arenaria

Scientific classification
- Kingdom: Animalia
- Phylum: Arthropoda
- Class: Insecta
- Order: Lepidoptera
- Family: Geometridae
- Tribe: Boarmiini
- Genus: Fagivorina; Wehrli, 1943

= Fagivorina =

Genus of moths

Fagivorina is a genus of moth in the family Geometridae.

== Species ==
- Fagivorina angularia (Thunberg, 1792)
- Fagivorina arenaria (Hufnagel, 1767)
- Fagivorina deumbrata Lempke, 1952
- Fagivorina grisea Mautz, 1941
- Fagivorina tenebraria Fielder
- Fagivorina viduata (Denis & Schiffermuller, 1775)
- Fagivorina viduaria Borkhausen, 1794
