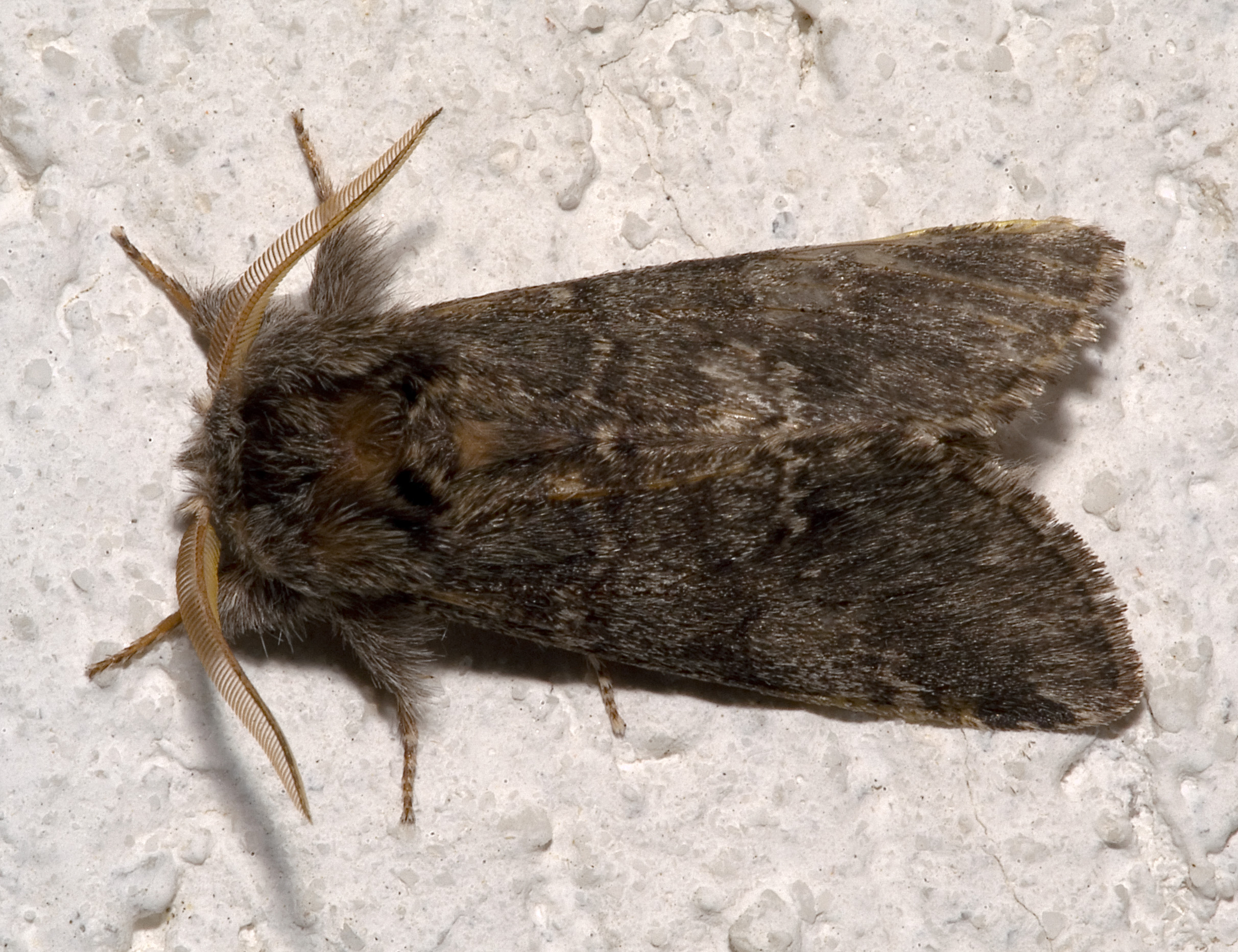
- Drymonia ruficornis

Scientific classification
- Kingdom: Animalia
- Phylum: Arthropoda
- Clade: Pancrustacea
- Class: Insecta
- Order: Lepidoptera
- Superfamily: Noctuoidea
- Family: Notodontidae
- Subfamily: Notodontinae
- Genus: Drymonia (Hübner, 1819)

= Drymonia =

Genus of moths

Drymonia is a genus of moths of the family Notodontidae erected by Jacob Hübner in 1819. It consists of the following species:

- Drymonia dodonaea (Denis & Schiffermüller, 1775)
- Drymonia dodonides (Staudinger, 1887)
- Drymonia obliterata (Esper, 1785)
- Drymonia querna (Denis & Schiffermüller, 1775)
- Drymonia ruficornis (Hufnagel, 1766)
- Drymonia velitaris (Hufnagel, 1766)
