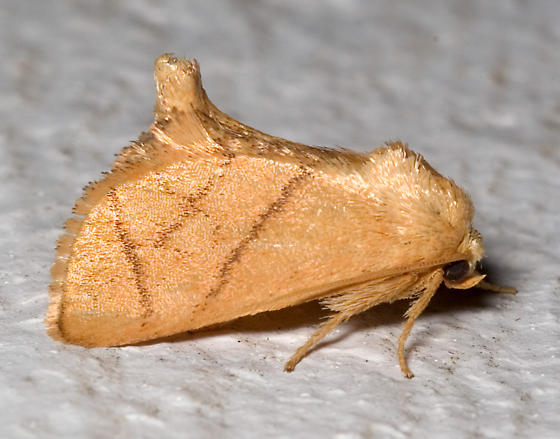

Scientific classification
- Kingdom: Animalia
- Phylum: Arthropoda
- Clade: Pancrustacea
- Class: Insecta
- Order: Lepidoptera
- Family: Limacodidae
- Genus: Apoda
- Species: A. y-inversum

Binomial name
- Apoda y-inversum (Packard, 1864)

Synonyms
- Apoda y-inversum parallela

= Apoda y-inversum =

Species of moth

Apoda y-inversum, the inverted Y slug moth or yellow-collared slug moth, is a moth of the family Limacodidae. It is found in North America from Quebec and Ontario, south to Florida, west to Oklahoma and Mississippi.

The wingspan is 21–30 mm. Adults are on wing from May to August.

The larvae feed on the leaves of beech, hickory, ironwood and oak.
