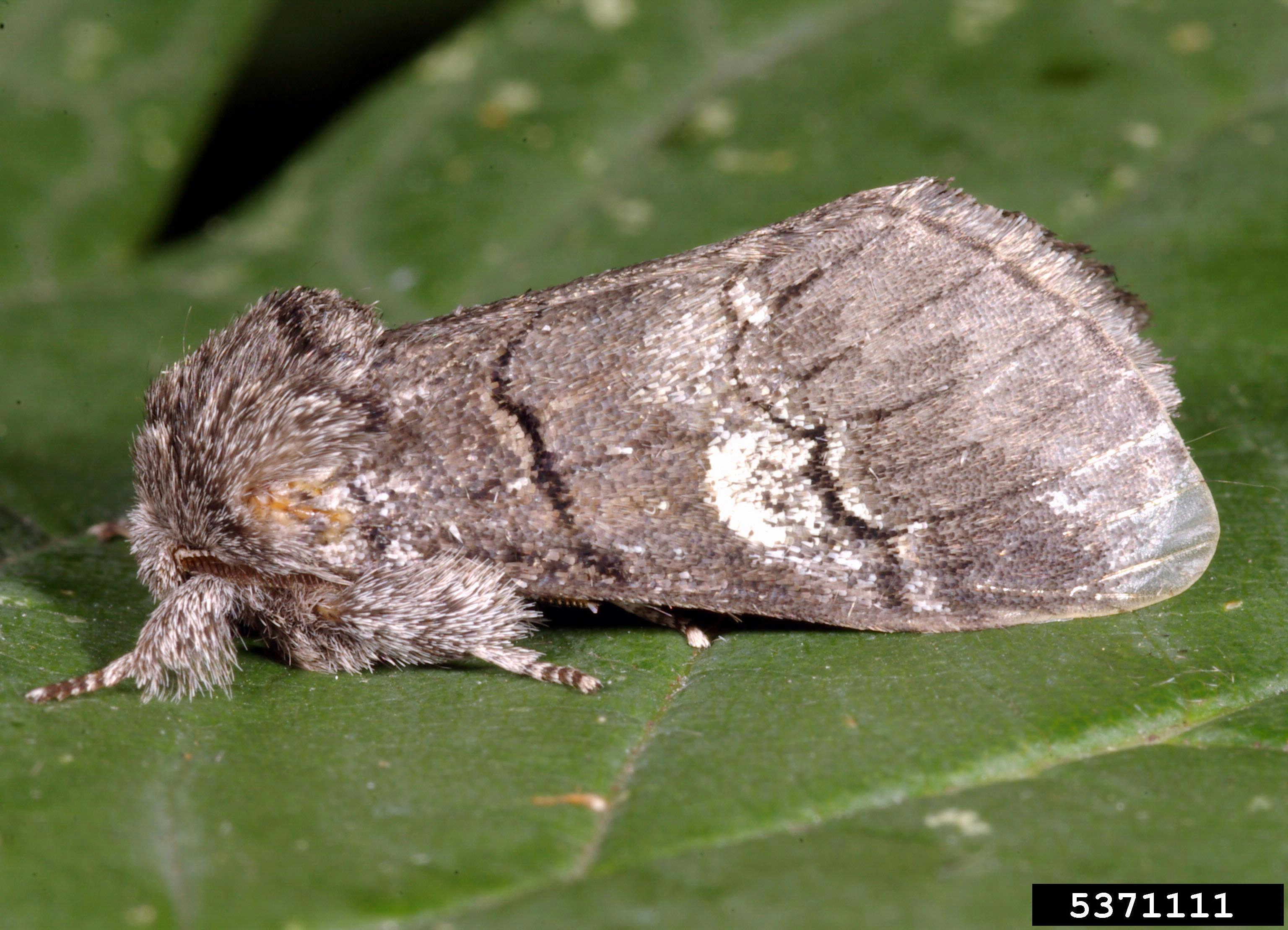

Scientific classification
- Kingdom: Animalia
- Phylum: Arthropoda
- Clade: Pancrustacea
- Class: Insecta
- Order: Lepidoptera
- Superfamily: Noctuoidea
- Family: Notodontidae
- Genus: Drymonia
- Species: D. querna

Binomial name
- Drymonia querna (Denis & Schiffermüller, 1775)

= Drymonia querna =

Species of moth

Drymonia querna, the oak marbled brown, is a moth of the family Notodontidae. It is found in the Middle East and mainland Europe except the north.

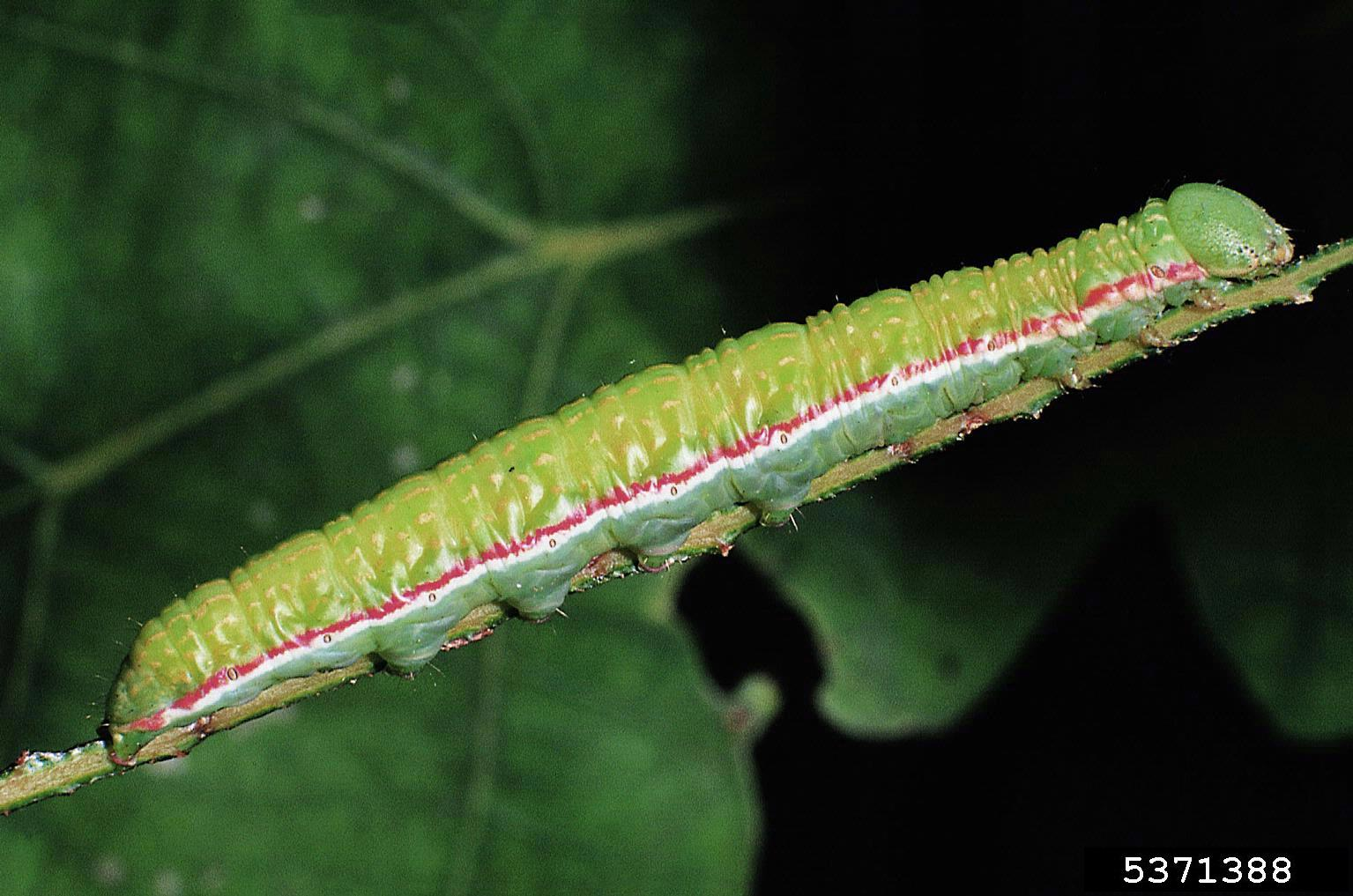
Caterpillar

The wingspan is 38–43 mm.The body and forewing are dark grey-brown, the latter with a slight reddish violet tone and sharply marked white lunule at apex of cell; before and again after the centre a black transverse line, the proximal one straight and only in front of hind margin curved outward, the distal one dentate with white edge, from which extend short black vein-streaks towards the margin; a light submarginal line undulate. Hindwing white in male, of a brownish tint in female. Larva green, with numerous minute whitish spots and approximated whitish subdorsal lines; on a level with the black-margined spiracles a red-edged longitudinal stripe which is interrupted at the segmental incisions; head greenish. May-June and August-October on Oak-bushes. Pupa black, in the ground in a cell lined with silk.

== Similar species ==
- Drymonia ruficornis qv.

== Biology ==
The moth flies from May to August depending on the location.

The larvae inhabit warm and dry woodlands and scrub in the lowlands. They feed on oak and also European beech.
