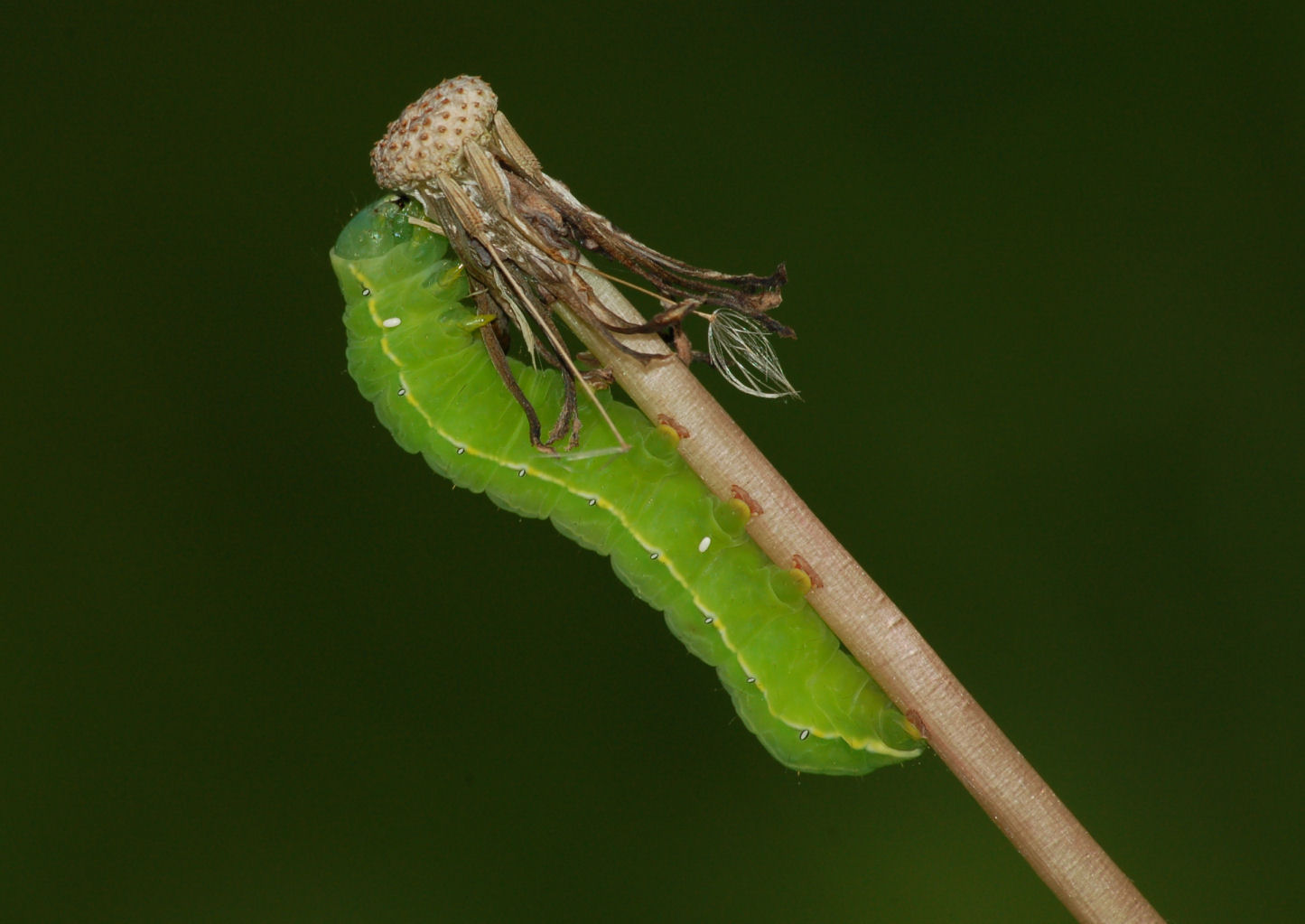
- Asteroscopus.jpg

Scientific classification
- Domain: Eukaryota
- Kingdom: Animalia
- Phylum: Arthropoda
- Class: Insecta
- Order: Lepidoptera
- Superfamily: Noctuoidea
- Family: Noctuidae
- Tribe: Psaphidini
- Genus: Asteroscopus; Boisduval, 1828

Synonyms
- Petasia

= Asteroscopus =

Genus of moths

Asteroscopus is a genus of moths of the family Noctuidae.

== Species ==
- Asteroscopus sphinx – The Sprawler (Hufnagel, 1766)
- Asteroscopus syriaca (Warren, 1910)
