= Drymonia dodonides =

Scientific classification
- Kingdom: Animalia
- Phylum: Arthropoda
- Clade: Pancrustacea
- Class: Insecta
- Order: Lepidoptera
- Superfamily: Noctuoidea
- Family: Notodontidae
- Genus: Drymonia
- Species: D. dodonides

Binomial name
- Drymonia dodonides Staudinger, 1887

Species of moth

Drymonia dodonides is a moth of the family Notodontidae. It is found in Japan.

The wingspan is 32–35 mm.
