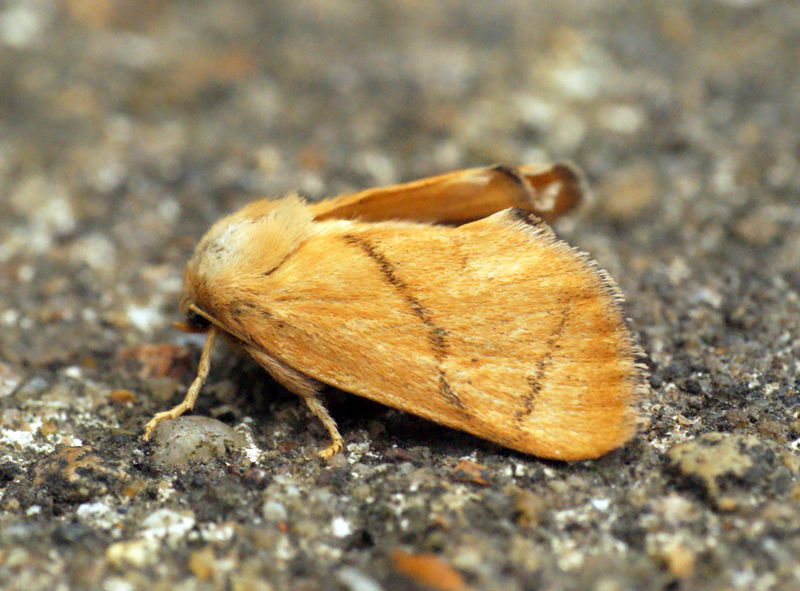
- Apoda limacodes

Scientific classification
- Kingdom: Animalia
- Phylum: Arthropoda
- Clade: Pancrustacea
- Class: Insecta
- Order: Lepidoptera
- Family: Limacodidae
- Genus: Apoda; Haworth, 1809

= Apoda (moth) =

Genus of moths

Apoda is a genus of slug caterpillar moths in the family Limacodidae. There are about 10 described species in Apoda.

== Species ==
These 10 species belong to the genus Apoda.

- Apoda avellana (Linnaeus, 1758)
- Apoda biguttata (Packard, 1864) (shagreened slug moth)
- Apoda christophi Graeser, 1888
- Apoda cretacea Holland, 1893
- Apoda creticum Rebel, 1906
- Apoda latomia Harvey, 1875 (western rectilinea slug moth)
- Apoda limacodes (Hufnagel, 1766)
- Apoda maxima Dyar, 1927
- Apoda rectilinea Grote & Robinson, 1868 (rectilinea slug moth)
- Apoda y-inversa Packard, 1864 (inverted Y slug moth)
