= Johann Siegfried Hufnagel =

German parson and entomologist

Johann Siegfried Hufnagel (17 October 1724, Falkenwalde, Prenzlau district, Brandenburg – 23 February 1795, Langenfeld, Sternberg district) was a German parson and entomologist (lepidopterist).

== Life ==
Until the late 20th century nothing was known about Hufnagel's life. Even his first names remained unknown. In 1987 Gerstberger and Stiesy succeeded in identifying him with the help of Fischer's work (1941) and uncovered some basic biographical information.

Hufnagel came from a family of Protestant clergymen, his father and grandfather before him having been parsons. Johann Siegfried probably attended one of the universities in northern or eastern Germany (but not in Berlin as Berlin had no university at the time). From 1759 to 1767 the Berlin address book mentions one "Hufnagel" or "Huffnagel" who was praeceptor (teacher) at the Protestant-Lutheran church near the Grosses Friedrichs-Hospital und Waisenhaus (hospital and orphanage) and lived in the orphanage. As this is consistent both with the career progression of young theologians at the time who often worked as teachers before their first appointment and with Fischer's records it seems safe to assume that this was indeed the lepidopterist Johann Siegfried Hufnagel. He had his first position in 1767 in Petersberg (Oststernberg district; today Jemiołów, Swiebodzin district, Poland). From 1775 until his death in 1795 he was the parson of Langenfeld (Oststernberg district, today Długoszyn, Sulecin district, Poland).

== Achievement and Impact ==
Between 1765 and 1767 Hufnagel published thirteen papers on Lepidoptera (moths and butterflies), ten of them during 1766, and all in the journal "Berlinisches Magazin, oder gesammlete [sic] Schriften und Nachrichten für die Liebhaber der Arzneywissenschaft, Naturgeschichte und der angenehmen Wissenschaften überhaupt", one of the learned journals covering a wide range of aspects in the fields of natural history and medicine which had been founded during the 18th century. One of his papers was devoted to agricultural pests, four contained descriptions of single species treated in some detail and accompanied by illustrations. The other eight papers formed a treatment in tabular form of the larger Lepidoptera (mainly the so-called Macrolepidoptera) of the Berlin area which were represented in Hufnagel's collection. Later authors often referred to this series of papers as "Die Tabellen" (the tables). Due to this form of presentation the descriptions of new species are very brief. A further impediment is Hufnagel's lack of a terminology for the wing pattern elements of Lepidoptera which makes his descriptions difficult to interpret even for native speakers of German. For example, the diagnosis of Phalaena grisea runs as follows: Die Graumotte. Ganz gelblichgrau mit vielen zerstreuten grauen und braunen Flecken. [The Grey Moth. Entirely yellowish grey with many scattered grey and brown spots.]

By the mid-1770s Hufnagel had become acquainted with Freiherr S. A. von Rottemburg who lived in Klemzig near Züllichau (then Neumark, today Poland). Hufnagel gave him his collection together with detailed explanations about his publications. In 1775 and 1776 Rottemburg published a series of papers on the Hufnagel collection redescribing many species in detail. It is mainly due to this work that most of Hufnagel's taxa can be identified. Unfortunately by this time a number of species seems to have been lost from the collection, and in some cases there seems to have been a mix-up of specimens, so that not all problems of identification are solved. Although many of Hufnagel's names had priority most authors of the early 19th century preferred to ignore them or to consider them as doubtful. It was not until 1844 when Philipp Christoph Zeller published an analysis of Hufnagel's work identifying many species that the names became known to a wider circle of lepidopterists and eventually began to gain acceptance.

The fate of the Hufnagel collection is unknown. Whether it was given back to Hufnagel or remained in Rottemburg's or his family's possession it has never been heard of again and most likely perished soon after Rottemburg's death.

At the current state of nomenclature 87 of Hufnagel's taxa are in use as valid names for Lepidoptera species.

== Publications ==
- Hufnagel, J. S. [as H==n==l] (1765): Beschreibung einer seltenen, bisher unbekannten Raupe, und der daraus entstehenden Phaläne. – Berlinisches Magazin, 1(6): 648-654, 1 pl.
- Hufnagel, J. S. (1766a): Tabelle von den Tagevögeln der hiesigen Gegend, worauf denen Liebhabern der Insekten Beschaffenheit, Zeit, Ort und andere Umstände der Raupen und der daraus entstehenden Schmetterlinge bestimmt werden. – Berlinisches Magazin, 2(1): 54-90.
- Hufnagel, J. S. (1766b): Natürliche Geschichte des Changeant oder Schielervogels mit seinen Verwandlungen. – Berlinisches Magazin, 2(2): 111-131, 1 pl.
- Hufnagel, J. S. [as H—l] (1766c): Zwote Tabelle worinnen die Abendvögel (Sphinges Linnaei) angezeigt, und denen vornehmsten Umständen nach beschrieben werden. – Berlinisches Magazin, 2(2): 174-195.
- Hufnagel, J. S. [author not stated] (1766d): Dritte Tabelle von den Nachtvögeln. – Berlinisches Magazin, 2(4): 391-437.
- Hufnagel, J. S. [as H===l] (1766e): Gedanken über die Mittel, die schädlichen Raupen zu vertilgen. – Berlinisches Magazin, 3(1): 3-19.
- Hufnagel, J. S. [author not stated] (1766f): Vierte Tabelle von den Insekten, oder Fortsetzung der Tabelle von den Nachtvögeln hiesiger Gegend, welche die Zwote Klasse derselben, nemlich die Nachteulen (Noctuas [sic]) in sich begreift. – Berlinisches Magazin, 3(2): 202-215.
- Hufnagel, J. S. [author not stated] (1766g): Fortsetzung der vierten Tabelle von den Insecten, besonders von denen so genannten Nachteulen als der zwoten Klasse der Nachtvögel hiesiger Gegend. – Berlinisches Magazin, 3(3): 279-309.
- Hufnagel, J. S. (1766h): Zwote Fortsetzung der vierten Tabelle von den Insecten, besonders von denen so genannten Nachteulen als der zwoten Klasse der Nachtvögel hiesiger Gegend. – Berlinisches Magazin, 3(4): 393-426.
- [Hufnagel, J. S.] (1766i): Beschreibung einer sehr bunten Raupe auf den Eichen, und der daraus entstehenden Phaläne Phalaena aprilina minor. – Berlinisches Magazin, 3(6): 555-559, 1 pl.
- Hufnagel, J. S. [as "H---l"] (1766k): Beschreibung einer seltenen und besonders schönen Phaläne. (Phalaena pyritoides.). – Berlinisches Magazin, 3(6): 560-562.
- Hufnagel, J. S. (1767a): Fortsetzung der Tabelle von den Nachtvögeln, welche die 3te Art derselben, nehmlich die Spannenmesser (Phalaenas Geometras [sic] Linnaei) enthält. – Berlinisches Magazin, 4(5): 504-527.
- Hufnagel, J. S. (1767b): III. Fortsetzung der Tabelle von den Nachtvögeln, welche die 3te Art derselben, nehmlich die Spannenmesser (Phalaenas Geometras [sic] Linnaei) enthält. – Berlinisches Magazin, 4(6): 599-626.

== Additional Sources ==
- Fischer, O. (1941): Evangelisches Pfarrerbuch für die Mark Brandenburg seit der Reformation. – Berlin (E. S. Mittler & Sohn).
- Gerstberger, M. & Stiesy, L. (1987): Schmetterlinge in Berlin-West. Teil II. – Berlin (Förderkreis der naturwissenschaftlichen Museen Berlins e. V.). 96 pp.
