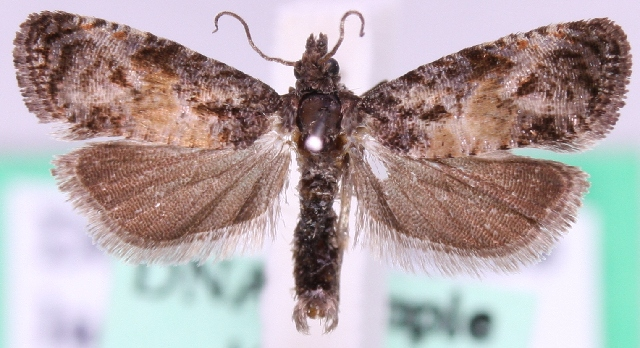

Scientific classification
- Kingdom: Animalia
- Phylum: Arthropoda
- Clade: Pancrustacea
- Class: Insecta
- Order: Lepidoptera
- Family: Tortricidae
- Genus: Endothenia
- Species: E. nigricostana

Binomial name
- Endothenia nigricostana (Haworth, 1811)

Synonyms
- Tortrix nigricostana Haworth, [1811]; Penthina illepidana Kennel, 1901; Tortrix (Coccyx) squalidana var. remyana Herrich-Schaffer, 1851; Tortrix remyana Herrich-Schaffer, 1848; Tortrix (Coccyx) squalidana Herrich-Schaffer, 1851

= Endothenia nigricostana =

Species of moth

Endothenia nigricostana, the black-edged marble, is a moth of the family Tortricidae. It was described by Adrian Hardy Haworth in 1811. It is found from most of Europe, east to Japan. The habitat consists of woodland margins and embankments.

The wingspan is 11–15 mm. Adults are on wing from May to July.

The larvae feed on Stachys palustris, Stachys sylvatica, and Lamium species. They eat down from the flower into the stem and roots.
