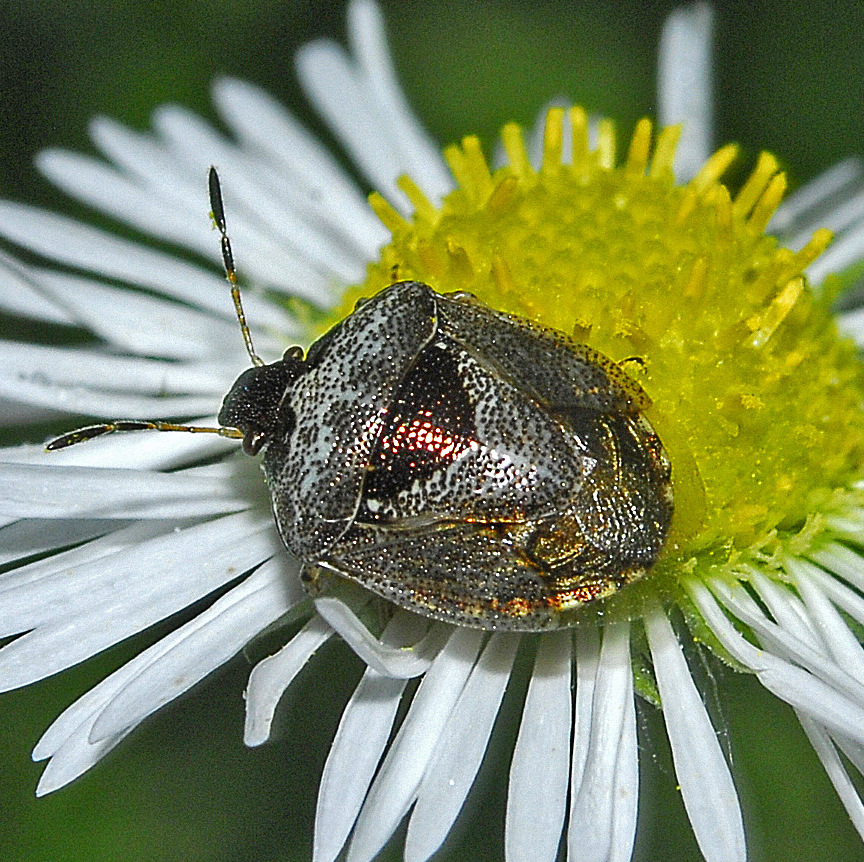
- Adult of Stagonomus venustissimus

Scientific classification
- Kingdom: Animalia
- Phylum: Arthropoda
- Clade: Pancrustacea
- Class: Insecta
- Order: Hemiptera
- Suborder: Heteroptera
- Family: Pentatomidae
- Genus: Stagonomus
- Species: S. venustissimus

Binomial name
- Stagonomus venustissimus (Schrank, 1776)

Synonyms
- List: Cimex melanocephalus Fabricius, 1775 (non Linnaeus, 1767); Stollia venustissima Schrank, 1776; Eysarcoris fabricii (Kirkaldy, 1904); Eysarcoris venustissimus (Schrank, 1776)

= Stagonomus venustissimus =

Species of true bug

Stagonomus venustissimus, common name woundwort shieldbug, is a species of shieldbug belonging to the family Pentatomidae, subfamily Pentatominae.

== Scientific name ==
The species was first named by Fabricius as Cimex melanocephalus. However this name had already been used by Linnaeus for the mirid bug now known as Phylus melanocephalus - at the time, the genus Cimex encompassed the entirety of the Heteroptera.

The replacement name Eysarcoris fabricii given by Kirkaldy in 1904 was used for many years, but Rider (1998) pointed out the seniority of the name venustissimus, given by Schrank in 1776 (Schönste Wanze, most beautiful bug).

This species has been recently transferred to the genus Stagonomus, so the correct name is Stagonomus venustissimus (Schrank, 1776).

== Distribution ==
This species can be found in most of Europe.

== Description ==
Stagonomus venustissimus can reach a length of 5–7 millimetres (0.20–0.28 in). These small bugs have a greenish-grey body. The head and the pronotum are copper coloured. They have a bronze-purple triangular stain at the base of the scutellum. The connexivum has black and white markings. The legs are whitish with black spots

== Biology ==
Stagonomus venustissimus is a univoltine species. The larvae are visible from late June to October, while the new generation of adults appear from August through the following July.

The nymphs feed on hedge woundwort (Stachys sylvatica), particularly the seeds, and on Lamiaceae species, especially on white dead-nettle (Lamium album).

== Gallery ==
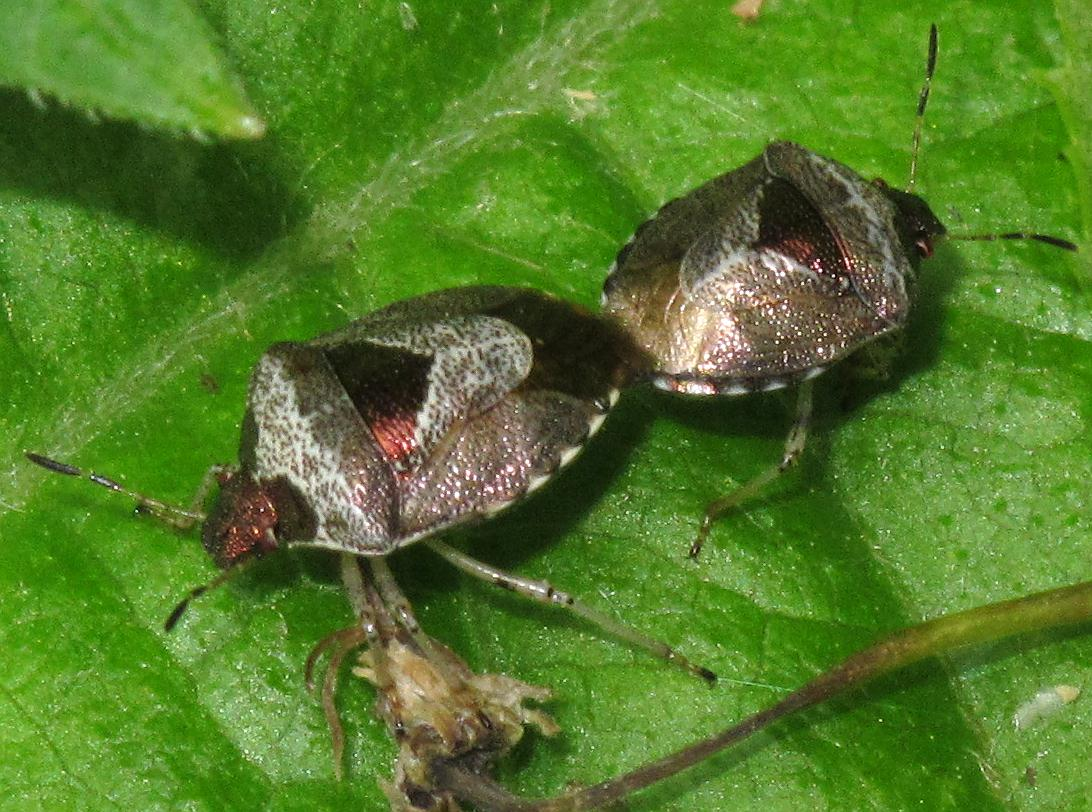
Mating

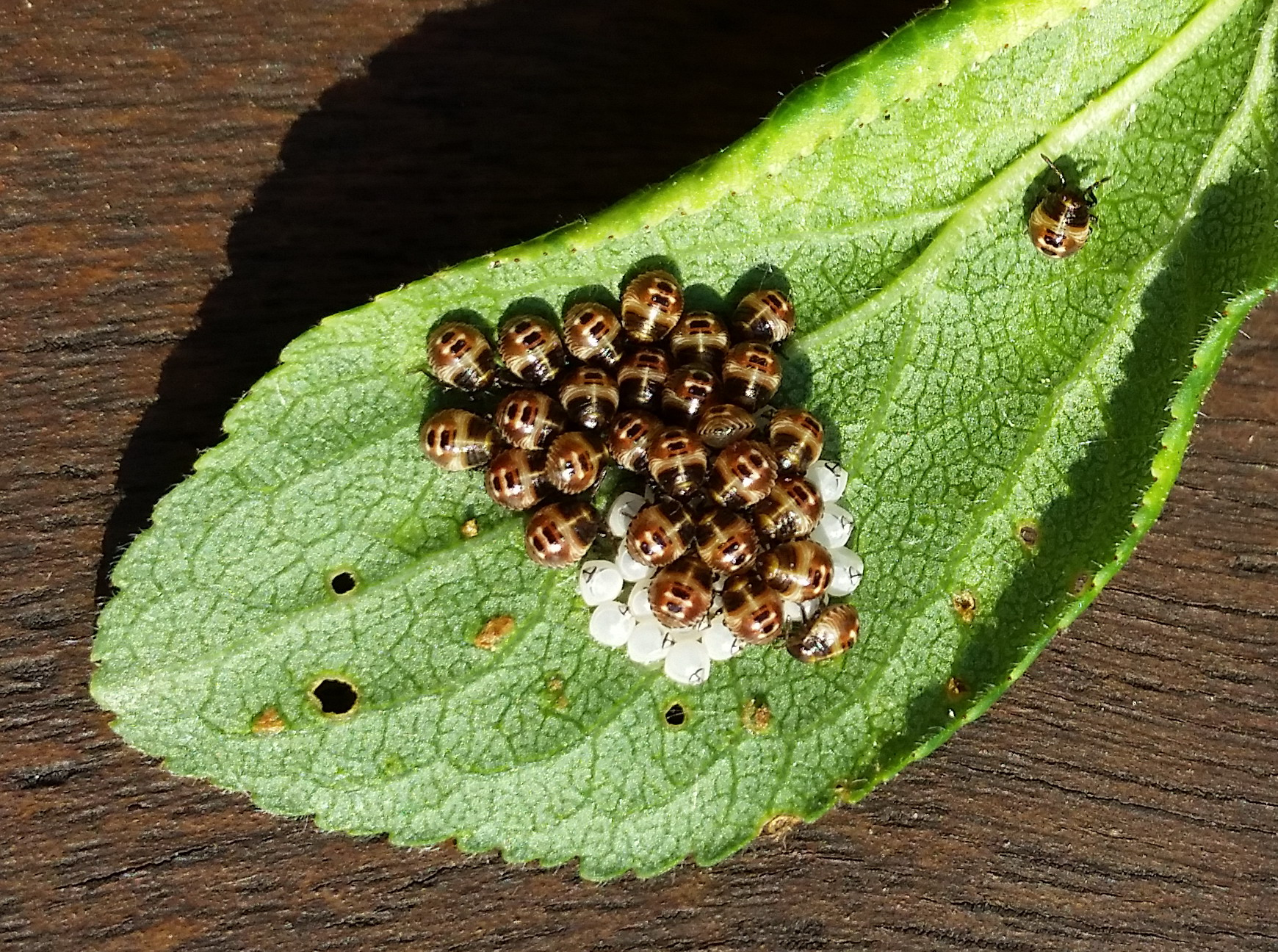
Eggs and young nymphs

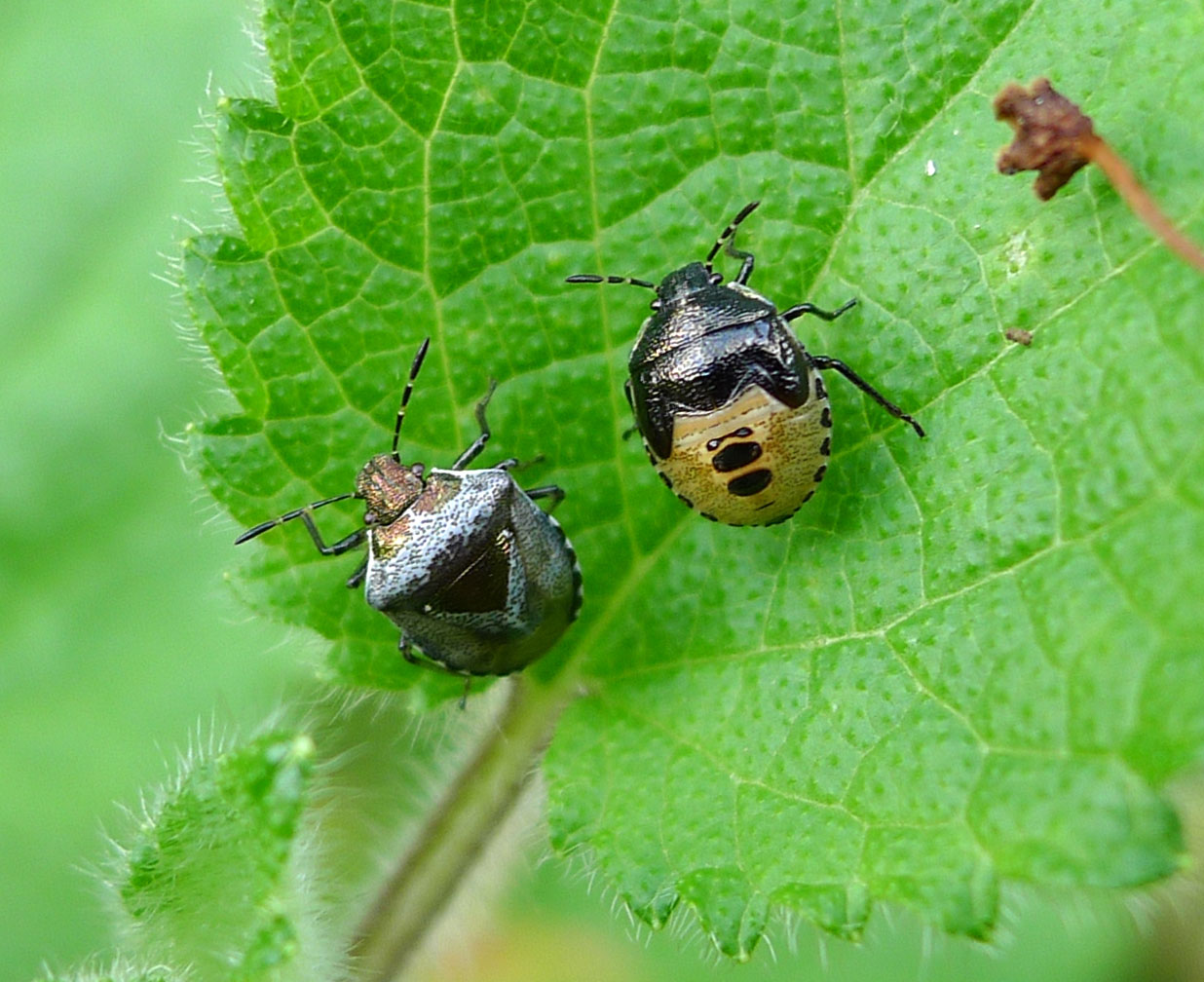
Adult with final instar nymph

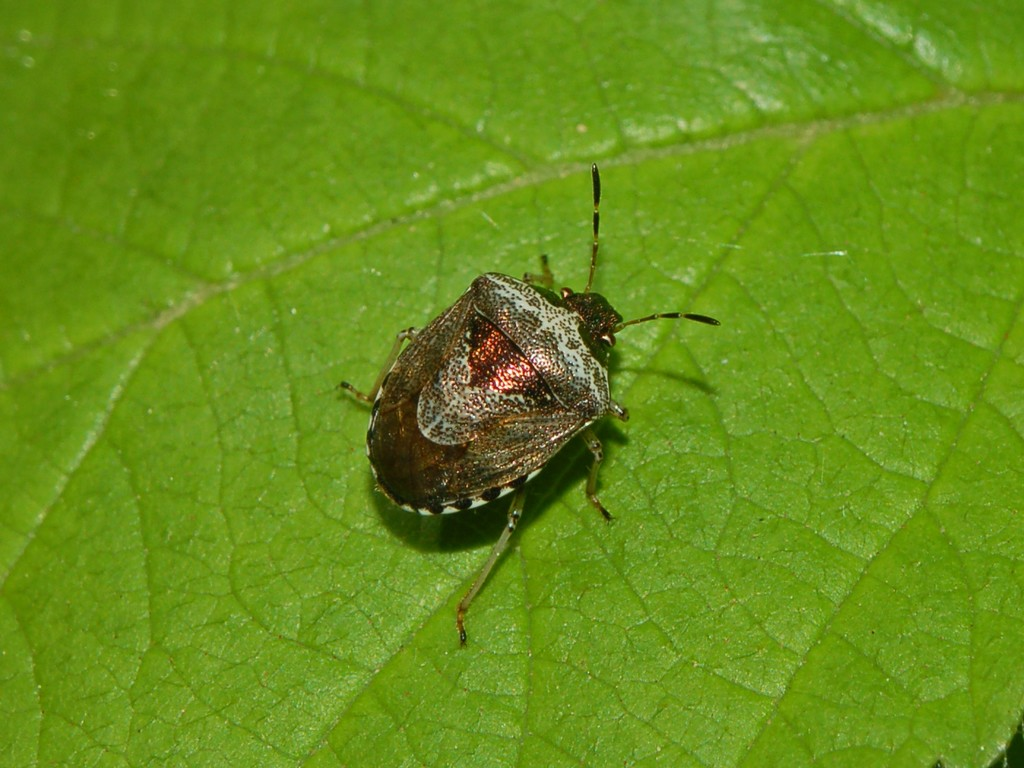
Imago
