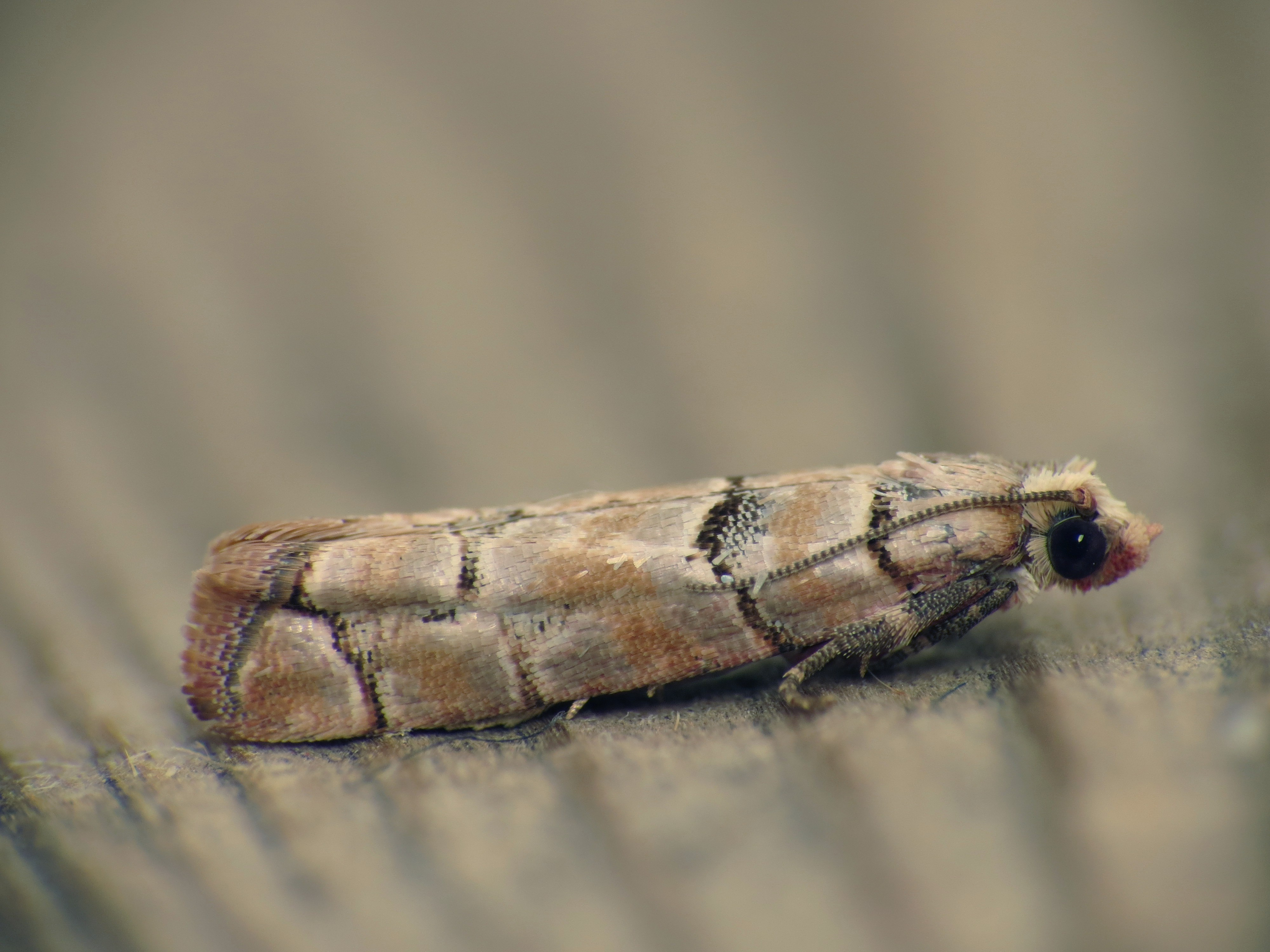
- Blastesthia tessulatana

Scientific classification
- Domain: Eukaryota
- Kingdom: Animalia
- Phylum: Arthropoda
- Class: Insecta
- Order: Lepidoptera
- Family: Tortricidae
- Tribe: Endotheniini
- Genus: Blastesthia; Obraztsov, 1960

Synonyms
- Pseudoccyx Baixeras, 1990; Pseudococcyx Agenjo, 1955; Pseudococcyx Swatschek, 1958; Subepiblema Agenjo, 1955

= Blastesthia =

Genus of tortrix moths

Blastesthia is a genus of moths belonging to the subfamily Olethreutinae of the family Tortricidae.

== Species ==
- Blastesthia mughiana (Zeller, 1868)
- Blastesthia posticana (Zetterstedt, 1839)
- Blastesthia tessulatana (Staudinger, 1871)
- Blastesthia turionella (Linnaeus, 1758)

== Former species ==
- Blastesthia fulvimitrana (Zetterstedt, 1839)
- Blastesthia mulsantiana (Zetterstedt, 1839)

== See also ==
- List of Tortricidae genera
