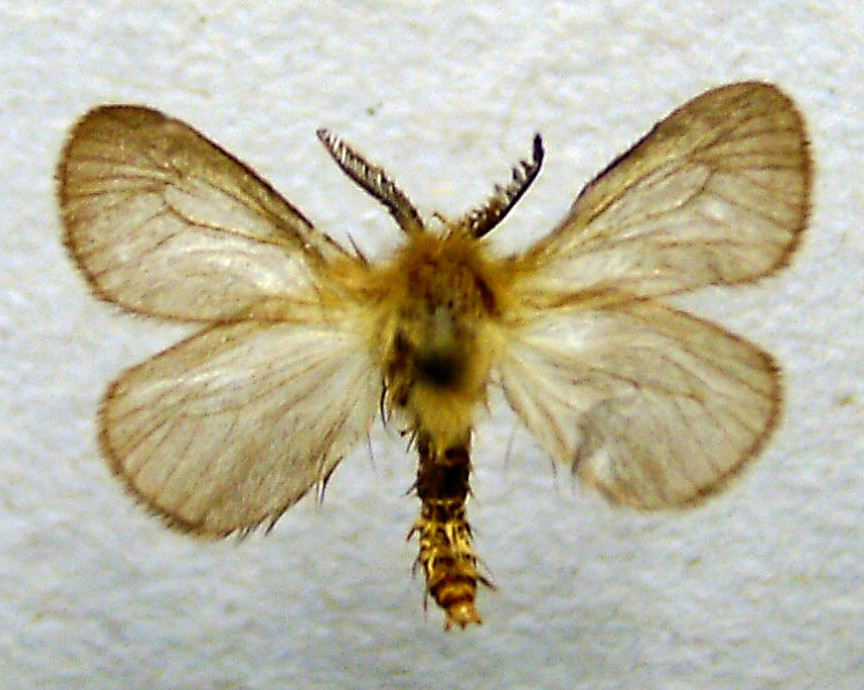

Scientific classification
- Domain: Eukaryota
- Kingdom: Animalia
- Phylum: Arthropoda
- Class: Insecta
- Order: Lepidoptera
- Family: Psychidae
- Genus: Megalophanes
- Species: M. viciella

Binomial name
- Megalophanes viciella (Denis & Schiffermüller, 1775)

Synonyms
- Psyche viciella

= Megalophanes viciella =

Species of moth

Megalophanes viciella is a moth of the Psychidae family. It is found in most of Europe, except most of northern Europe, the Mediterranean and Great Britain. It is also found across the Palearctic to Japan.

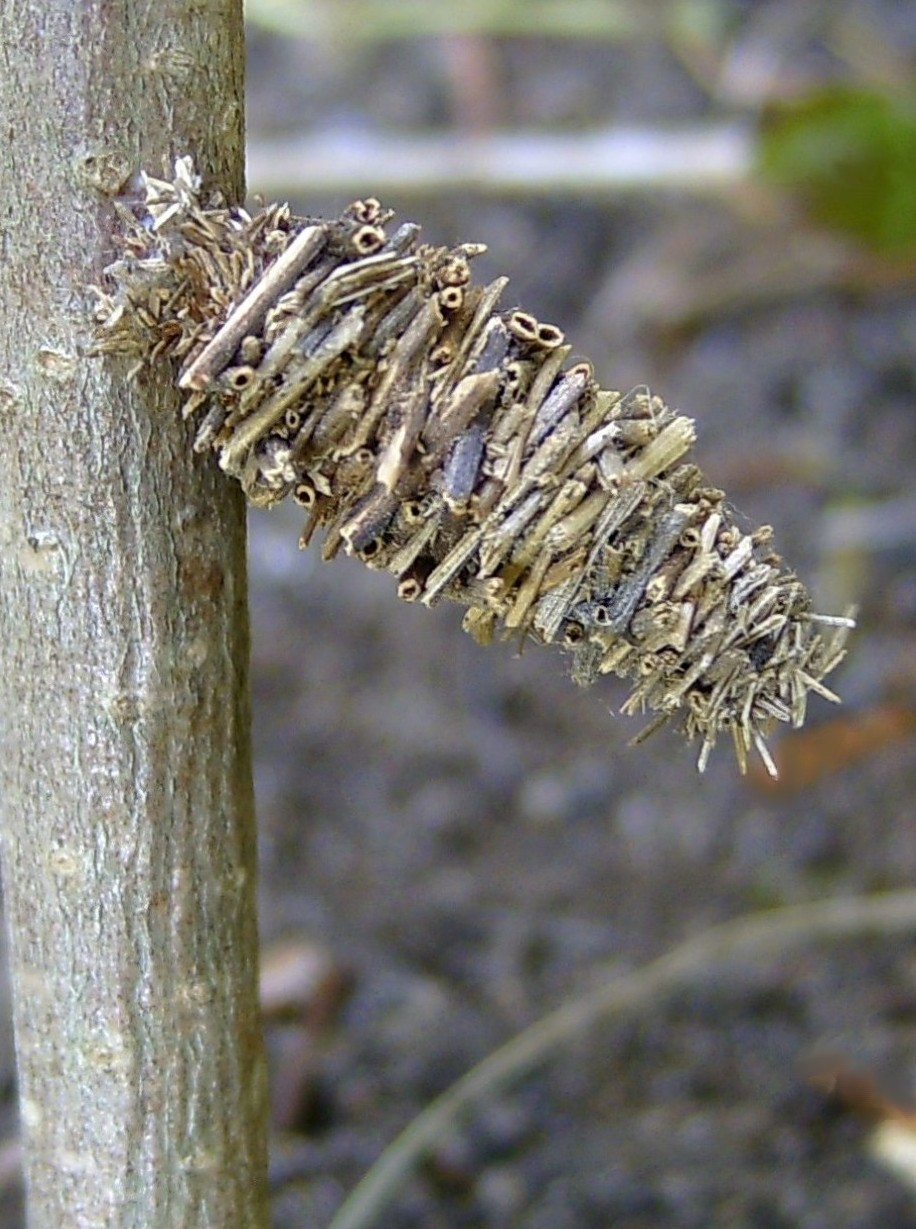
Case

There is strong sexual dimorphism in the adults. Males have a wingspan of 18–22 mm, females reach a length of 9–11 mm and are wingless. Adults are on wing from June to July.

The larvae feed on various plants, including Vicia, Rumex, Scirpus, Calluna vulgaris, Betula pubescens, Stachys palustris and Vaccinium uliginosum.
