= Endotheniini =

Scientific classification
- Domain: Eukaryota
- Kingdom: Animalia
- Phylum: Arthropoda
- Class: Insecta
- Order: Lepidoptera
- Family: Tortricidae
- Subfamily: Olethreutinae
- Tribe: Endotheniini; Diakonoff, 1973

Genera
- See text

Tribe of moths

The Endotheniini are a tribe of tortrix moths.

== Genera ==
Endothenia
Hulda
Saliciphaga
Taniva
Tia
