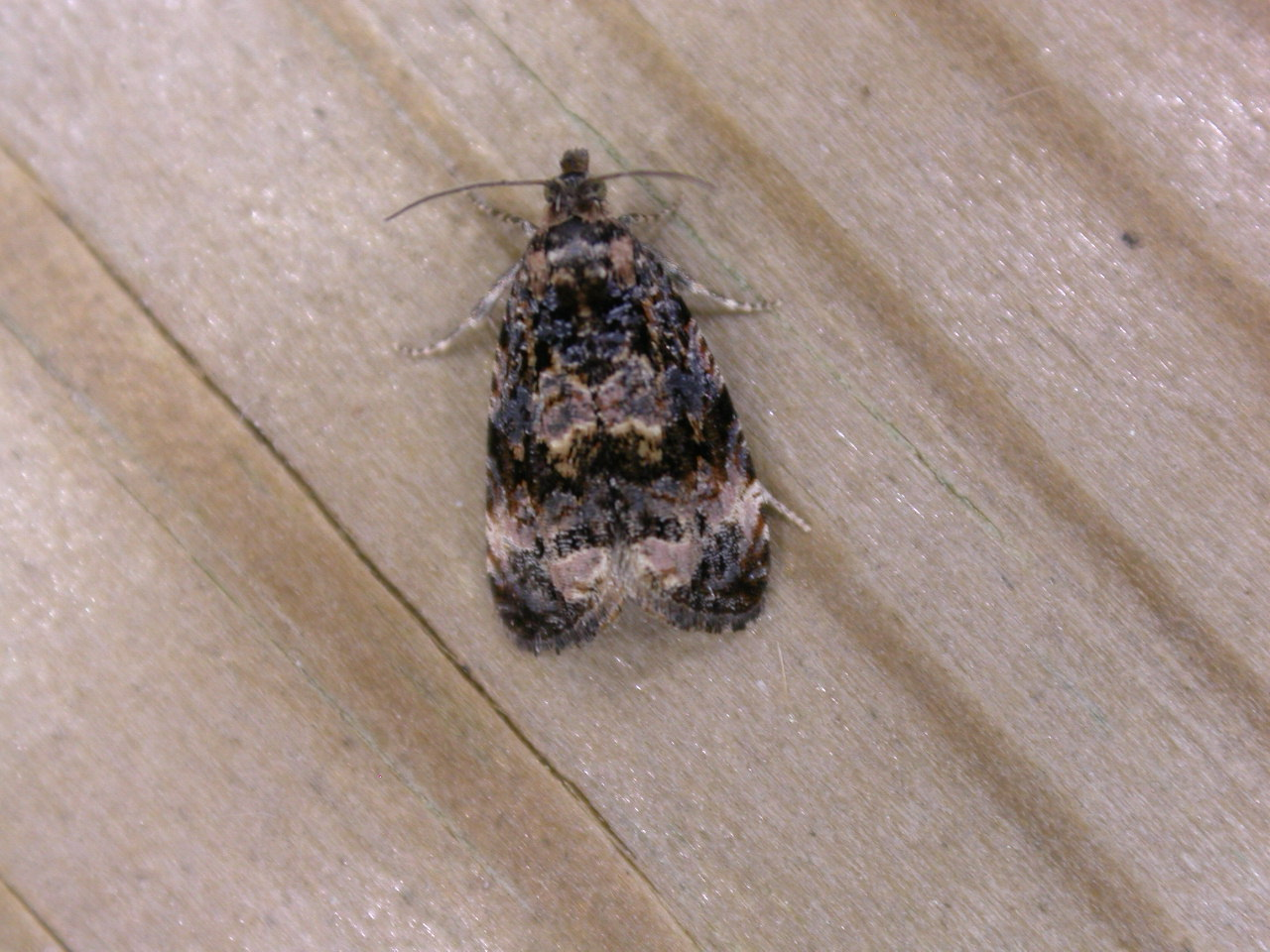
- Endothenia oblongana

Scientific classification
- Domain: Eukaryota
- Kingdom: Animalia
- Phylum: Arthropoda
- Class: Insecta
- Order: Lepidoptera
- Family: Tortricidae
- Tribe: Endotheniini
- Genus: Endothenia; Stephens, 1852

Synonyms
- Alloendothenia Oku, 1963; Neothenia Diakonoff, 1973

= Endothenia =

Genus of tortrix moths

Endothenia is a genus of moths belonging to the subfamily Olethreutinae of the family Tortricidae.

== Species ==
- Endothenia affiliana McDunnough, 1942
- Endothenia albolineana
- Endothenia alpigena Bradley, 1965
- Endothenia anthracana (Forbes, 1931)
- Endothenia atrata (Caradja, 1926)
- Endothenia austerana (Kennel, 1916)
- Endothenia bacillata Diakonoff, 1973
- Endothenia banausopis (Meyrick in Caradja & Meyrick, 1938)
- Endothenia bira Kawabe, 1976
- Endothenia citharistis (Meyrick, 1909)
- Endothenia conditana (Walsingham, 1879)
- Endothenia eidolon Razowski & Pelz, 2002
- Endothenia engone Diakonoff, 1984
- Endothenia ericetana (Humphreys & Westwood, 1845)
- Endothenia euryteles (Meyrick, 1936)
- Endothenia furvida Falkovitsh, 1970
- Endothenia gentianaeana (Hubner, [1796-1799])
- Endothenia hebesana (Walker, 1863)
- Endothenia heinrichi McDunnough, 1929
- Endothenia informalis (Meyrick, in Caradja & Meyrick, 1935)
- Endothenia infuscata Heinrich, 1923
- Endothenia ingrata Falkovitsh, 1970
- Endothenia kostyuki Kuznetzov, 1994
- Endothenia lapideana (Herrich-Schaffer, 1851)
- Endothenia limata Falkovitsh, 1962
- Endothenia lutescens Diakonoff, 1973
- Endothenia marginana (Haworth, [1811])
- Endothenia melanosticta (Walsingham, 1895)
- Endothenia menthivora (Oku, 1963)
- Endothenia micans Diakonoff, 1973
- Endothenia microptera Clarke, 1953
- Endothenia mollisana (Walker, 1863)
- Endothenia montanana (Kearfott, 1907)
- Endothenia nephelopsycha (Meyrick, 1934)
- Endothenia nigricostana (Haworth, [1811])
- Endothenia nubilana (Clemens, 1865)
- Endothenia oblongana (Haworth, [1811])
- Endothenia pauperculana (Staudinger, 1859)
- Endothenia polymetalla (Turner, 1916)
- Endothenia pullana (Haworth, [1811])
- Endothenia quadrimaculana (Haworth, [1811])
- Endothenia remigera Falkovitsh, 1970
- Endothenia rhachistis (Diakonoff, 1973)
- Endothenia rubipunctana (Kearfott, 1907)
- Endothenia sordulenta Heinrich, 1926
- Endothenia sororiana (Herrich-Schaffer, 1851)
- Endothenia trizona Diakonoff, 1973
- Endothenia ustulana (Haworth, [1811])
- Endothenia vasculigera Meyrick, 1938
- Endothenia villosula Falkovitsh, 1966

== See also ==
- List of Tortricidae genera
