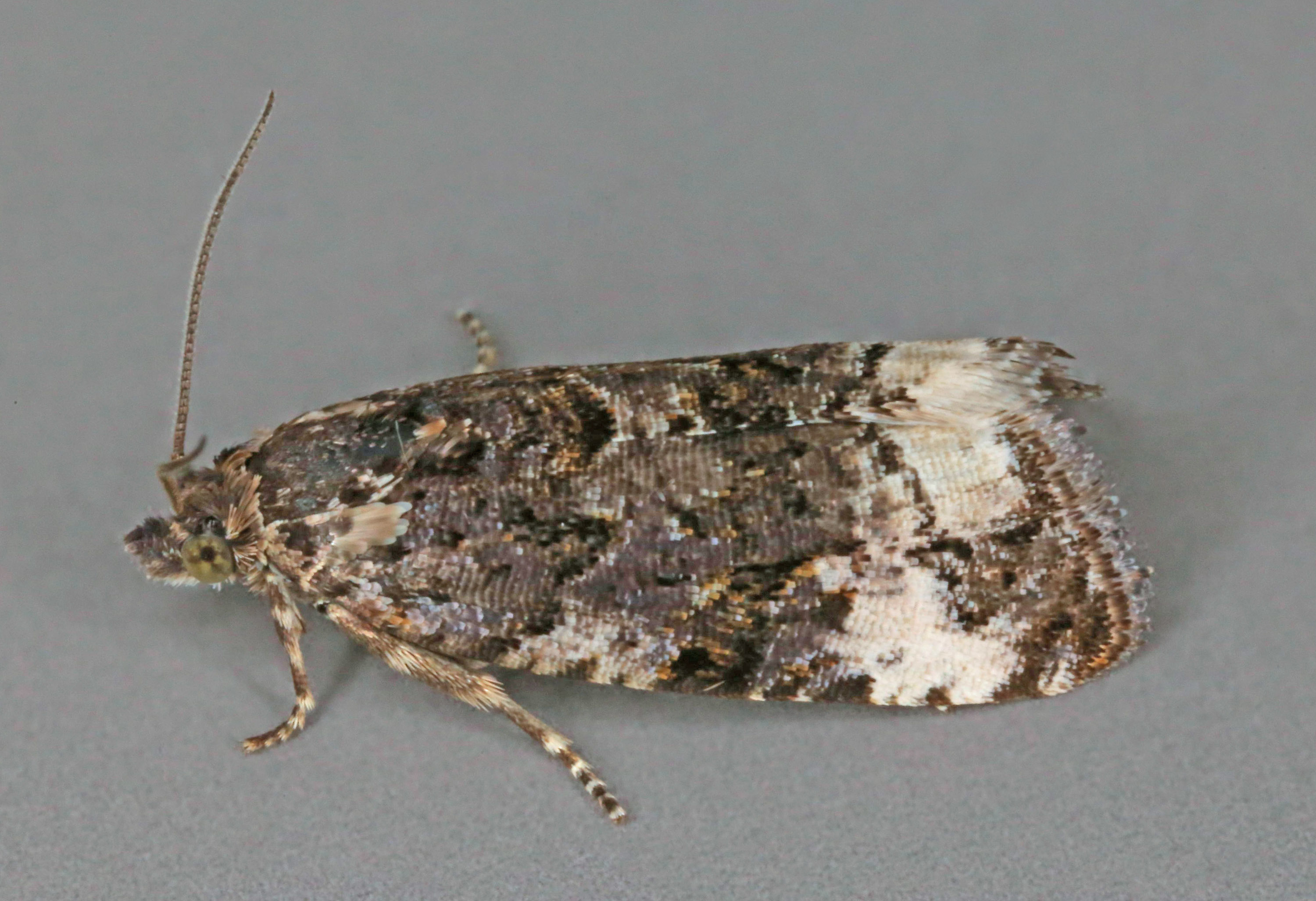

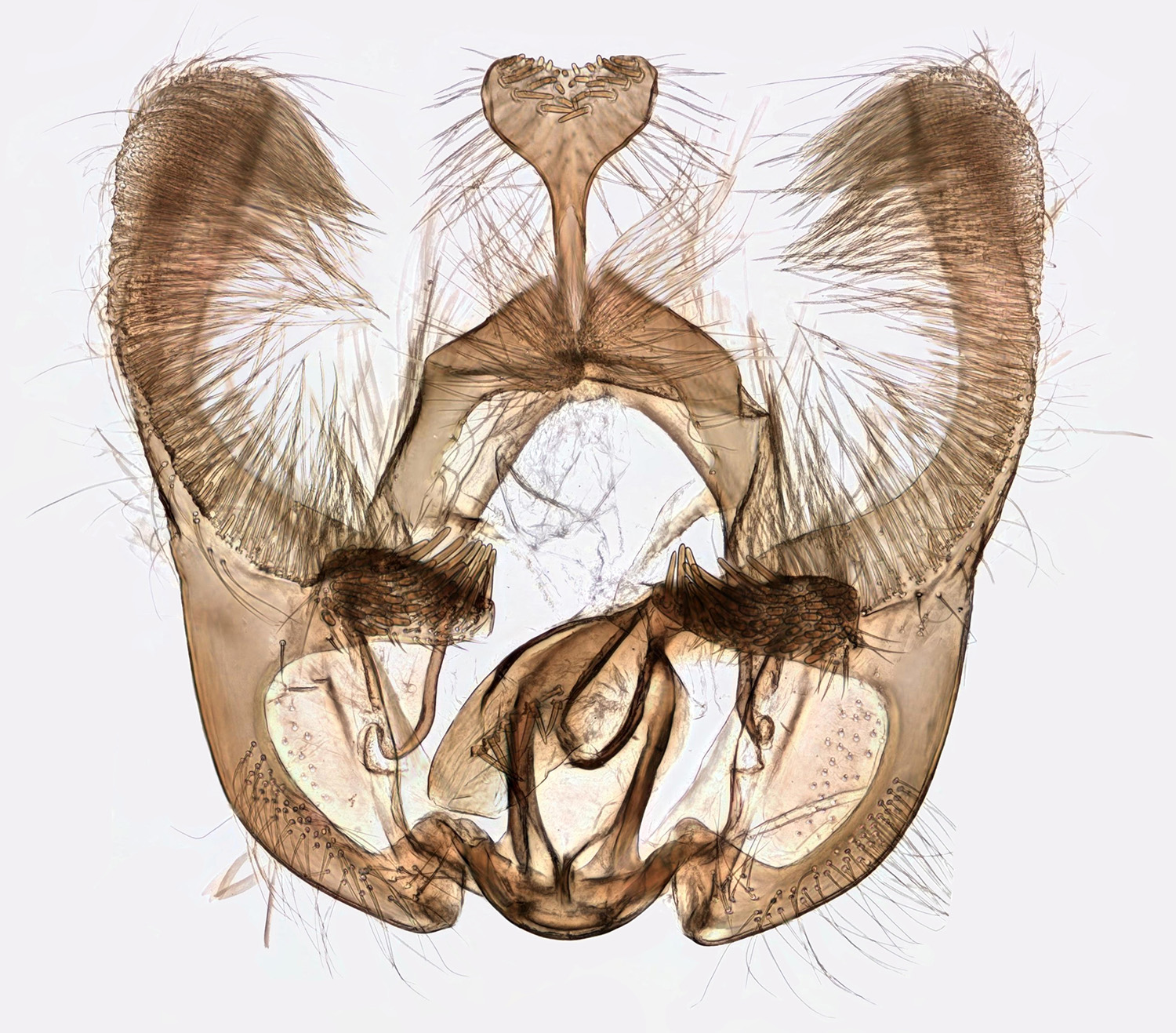
- Male genitalia specimen from Anglesey, North Wales

Scientific classification
- Kingdom: Animalia
- Phylum: Arthropoda
- Clade: Pancrustacea
- Class: Insecta
- Order: Lepidoptera
- Family: Tortricidae
- Genus: Endothenia
- Species: E. marginana

Binomial name
- Endothenia marginana (Haworth, 1811)

Synonyms
- Tortrix marginana Haworth, [1811]; Antithesia similana Wilkinson, 1859; Endothenia marginana tarandina Laasonen & Laasonen, 1995

= Endothenia marginana =

Species of moth

Endothenia marginana, the downland marble, is a moth of the family Tortricidae. It was described by Adrian Hardy Haworth in 1811. It is found in almost all of Europe and across the Palearctic.

The wingspan is 11–16 mm. The male can be identified by the white hind wings, but the female is difficult to determine based on its external appearance alone. Dissection of the genitalia is necessary to determine Endothenia species with certainty. The forewings pattern is dark brown, grey, black and white. In the outer part there is an irregular white cross-band that is often interrupted in the middle. The male's hind wings are characteristically silky white with brown dusting in the outer part, while the female has brown hind wings like most other Endothenia species. The larva is pale orange.

Adults are on wing from late May to August.

The larvae feed on Dipsacus fullonum, Betonica officinalis, Galeopsis species, Pedicularis species, Rhinanthus species and Plantago lanceolata. They feed within the seedheads of their host plant. Larvae can be found from September to June.
