= Endothenia vasculigera =

Scientific classification
- Kingdom: Animalia
- Phylum: Arthropoda
- Class: Insecta
- Order: Lepidoptera
- Family: Tortricidae
- Genus: Endothenia
- Species: E. vasculigera

Binomial name
- Endothenia vasculigera Meyrick, 1938

Species of moth

Endothenia vasculigera is a species of moth of the family Tortricidae. It is found in the Democratic Republic of Congo.
