= Saliciphaga =

Scientific classification
- Domain: Eukaryota
- Kingdom: Animalia
- Phylum: Arthropoda
- Class: Insecta
- Order: Lepidoptera
- Family: Tortricidae
- Tribe: Endotheniini
- Genus: Saliciphaga; Falkovitsh, 1962

Genus of tortrix moths

Saliciphaga is a genus of moths belonging to the subfamily Olethreutinae of the family Tortricidae.

== Species ==
- Saliciphaga acharis (Butler, 1879)
- Saliciphaga caesia Falkovitsh, 1962

== See also ==
- List of Tortricidae genera
