= Endothenia nephelopsycha =

Scientific classification
- Kingdom: Animalia
- Phylum: Arthropoda
- Class: Insecta
- Order: Lepidoptera
- Family: Tortricidae
- Genus: Endothenia
- Species: E. nephelopsycha

Binomial name
- Endothenia nephelopsycha (Meyrick, 1934)

Synonyms
- Argyroploce nephelopsycha Meyrick, 1934

Species of moth

Endothenia nephelopsycha is a species of moth of the family Tortricidae. It is found in Uganda.
