= Endothenia sororiana =

Scientific classification
- Domain: Eukaryota
- Kingdom: Animalia
- Phylum: Arthropoda
- Class: Insecta
- Order: Lepidoptera
- Family: Tortricidae
- Genus: Endothenia
- Species: E. sororiana

Binomial name
- Endothenia sororiana (Herrich-Schaffer, 1850)

Species of moth

Endothenia sororiana is a species of moth belonging to the family Tortricidae.

Synonym:

- Penthina sororiana Herrich-Schaffer, 1850 (= basionym)
