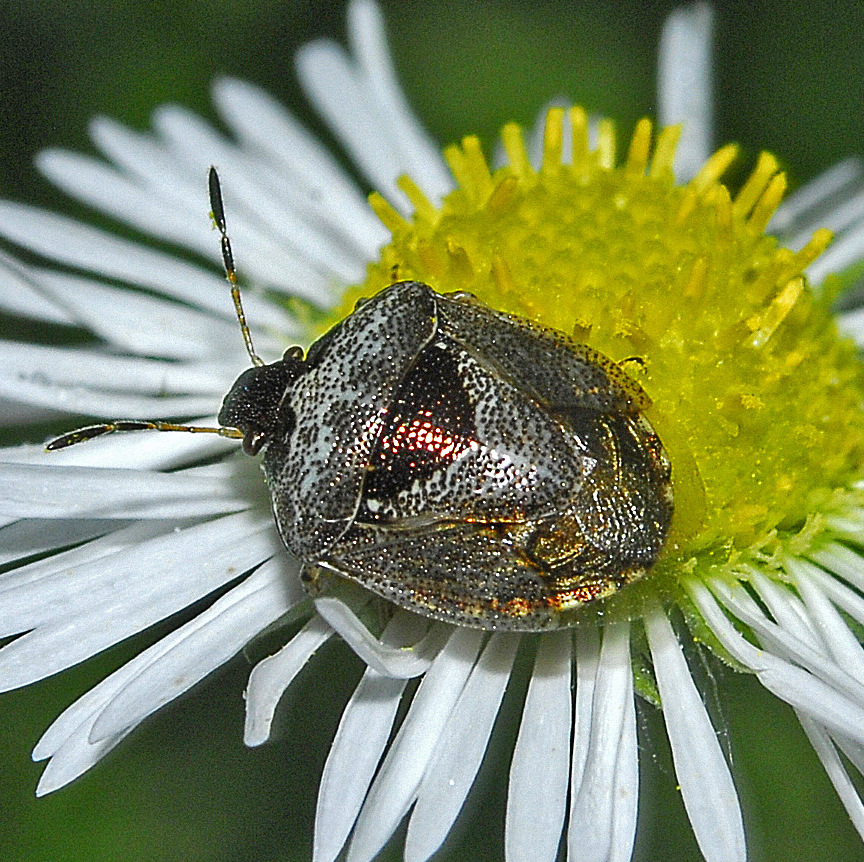
- Stagonomus venustissimus

Scientific classification
- Kingdom: Animalia
- Phylum: Arthropoda
- Clade: Pancrustacea
- Class: Insecta
- Order: Hemiptera
- Suborder: Heteroptera
- Family: Pentatomidae
- Subfamily: Pentatominae
- Tribe: Eysarcorini
- Genus: Stagonomus; Gorski, 1852

Synonyms
- Daleria Mulsant & Rey, 1866; Dalleria Mulsant & Rey, 1866; Onylia Mulsant & Rey, 1866; Stagonomus Amyot, 1846

= Stagonomus =

Genus of true bugs

Stagonomus is a genus of shieldbug belonging to the family Pentatomidae, subfamily Pentatominae and tribe Eysarcorini, erected by Stanisław Batys Gorskiin 1852. Species have been recorded from the Palaearctic and Oriental realms.

== Species ==
Species within this genus include:

- Stagonomus amoenus (Brullé, 1832)
- Stagonomus bipunctatus (Linnaeus, 1758)
- Stagonomus devius Seidenstücker, 1965
- Stagonomus grenieri Signoret, 1865
- Stagonomus venustissimus (Schrank, 1776)
