= Endothenia menthivora =

Scientific classification
- Domain: Eukaryota
- Kingdom: Animalia
- Phylum: Arthropoda
- Class: Insecta
- Order: Lepidoptera
- Family: Tortricidae
- Genus: Endothenia
- Species: E. menthivora

Binomial name
- Endothenia menthivora (Oku, 1963)

Synonyms
- Alloendothenia menthivora Oku, 1963

Species of moth

Endothenia menthivora, the mint rhizome worm, is a moth of the family Tortricidae. It is endemic to Japan.

The wingspan is 15–18 mm. Adults emerge from their cocoons from early July to mid August. There seems to be one generation per year.

The larvae feed on Mentha species. The larvae bore into the stem and rhizomes of the host plant.
