= Endothenia rhachistis =

Scientific classification
- Domain: Eukaryota
- Kingdom: Animalia
- Phylum: Arthropoda
- Class: Insecta
- Order: Lepidoptera
- Family: Tortricidae
- Genus: Endothenia
- Species: E. rhachistis

Binomial name
- Endothenia rhachistis (Diakonoff, 1973)

Synonyms
- Polychrosis acanthis Meyrick, 1924; Pseudosciaphila rhachistis Diakonoff, 1973

Species of moth

Endothenia rhachistis is a moth of the family Tortricidae first described by Alexey Diakonoff in 1973. It is found in India and Sri Lanka.

Its larval food plant is Justicia gendarussa.
