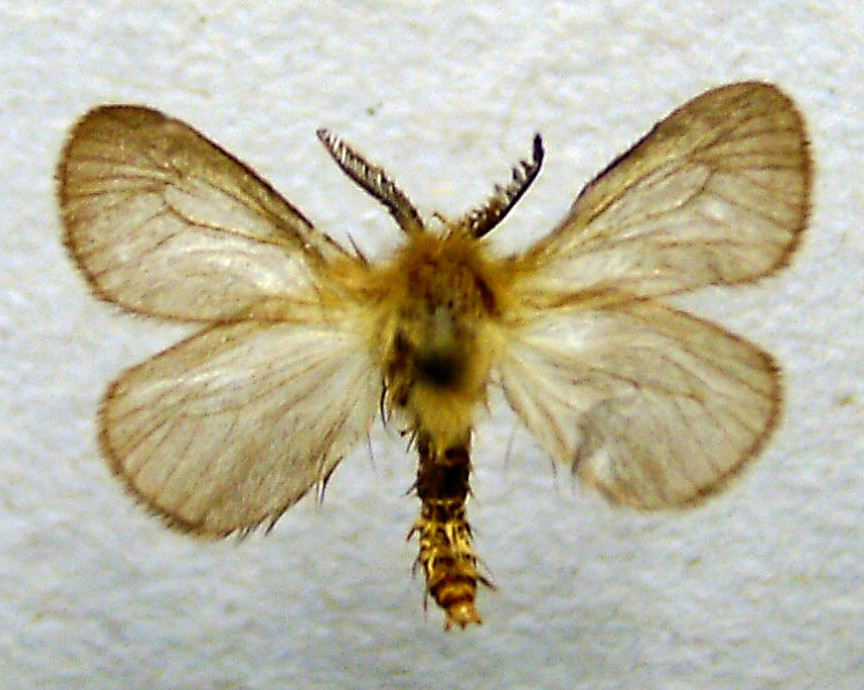
- Megalophanes viciella

Scientific classification
- Domain: Eukaryota
- Kingdom: Animalia
- Phylum: Arthropoda
- Class: Insecta
- Order: Lepidoptera
- Family: Psychidae
- Genus: Megalophanes; Heylaerts, 1881

= Megalophanes =

Genus of moths

Megalophanes is a genus of moths belonging to the family Psychidae.

The species of this genus are found in Europe.

Species:

- Megalophanes brachycornis Kozhantshikov, 1956
- Megalophanes stetinensis (Hering, 1846)
- Megalophanes turatii (Staudinger, 1877)
- Megalophanes viciella (Denis & Schiffermuller, 1775)
