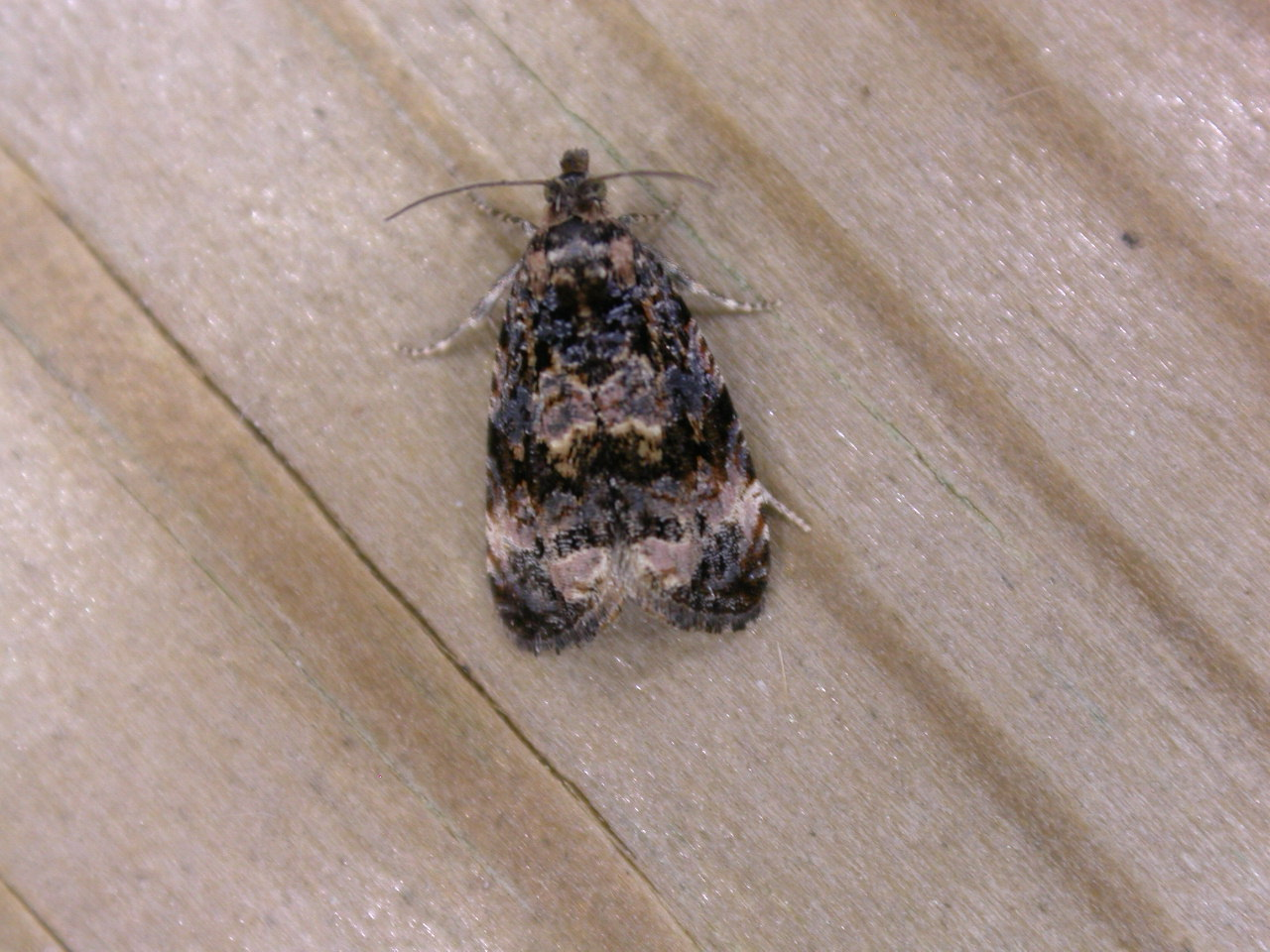

Scientific classification
- Kingdom: Animalia
- Phylum: Arthropoda
- Clade: Pancrustacea
- Class: Insecta
- Order: Lepidoptera
- Family: Tortricidae
- Genus: Endothenia
- Species: E. oblongana

Binomial name
- Endothenia oblongana (Haworth, 1811)

Synonyms
- Tortrix oblongana Haworth, [1811]

= Endothenia oblongana =

Species of moth

Endothenia oblongana is a moth of the family Tortricidae. It is found in the Palearctic realm.

The wingspan is 11–15 mm. The moth flies from May to August depending on the location.

The larvae feed on various herbaceous plants.
