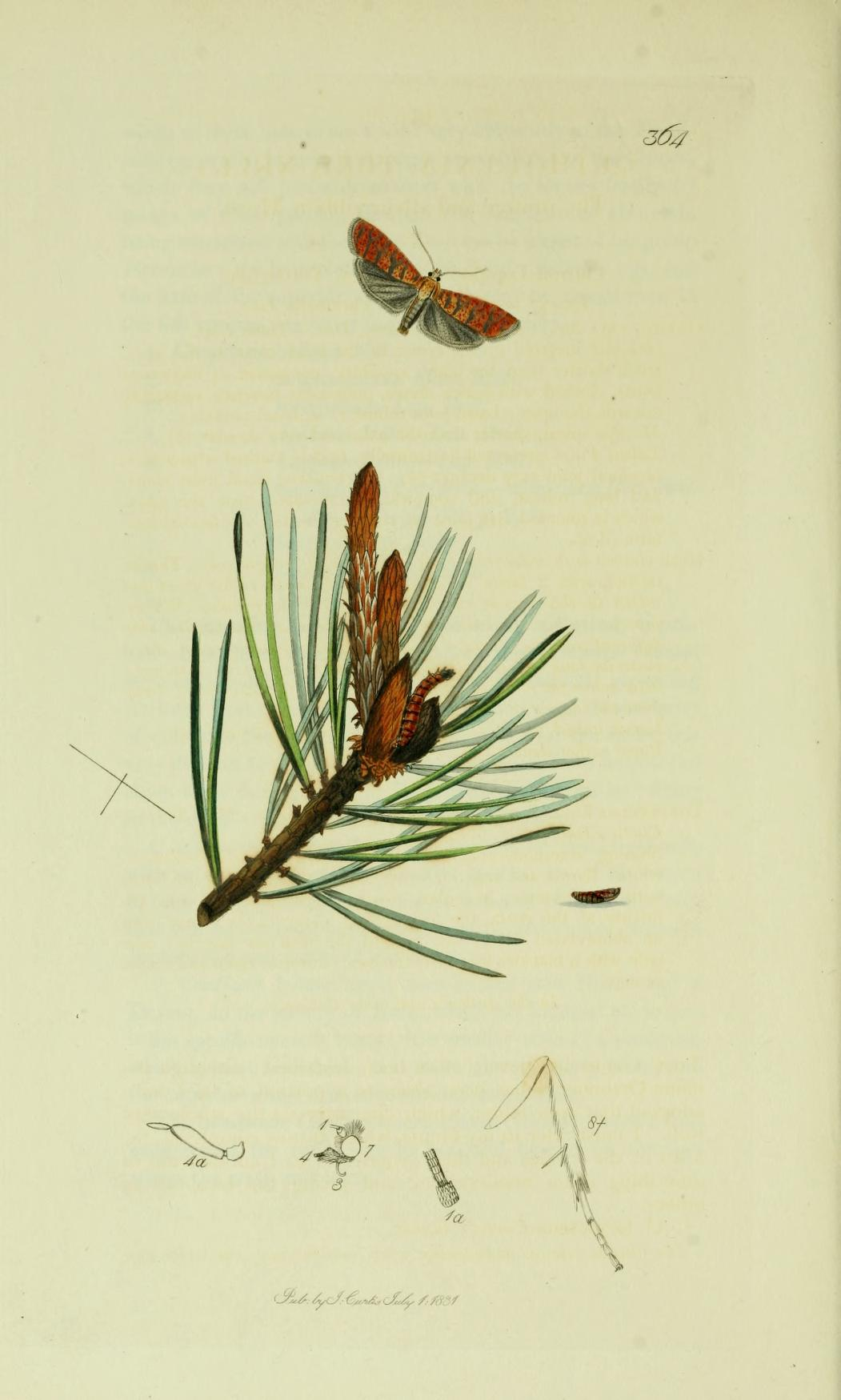
- Illustration from John Curtis's British Entomology Volume 6

Scientific classification
- Kingdom: Animalia
- Phylum: Arthropoda
- Class: Insecta
- Order: Lepidoptera
- Family: Tortricidae
- Genus: Blastesthia
- Species: B. turionella

Binomial name
- Blastesthia turionella (Linnaeus, 1758)

Synonyms
- Coccyx turionella; Orthotaenia turionella (Linnaeus, 1758); Pseudococcyx turionella (Linnaeus, 1758); Phalaena (Tortrix) turionella Linnaeus, 1758; Tortrix turionana Hubner, [1813]

= Blastesthia turionella =

Pine bud moth

Species of moth

Blastesthia turionella, the pine bud moth, is a moth of the family Tortricidae. It is found from Europe to eastern Russia, China (Inner Mongolia), Korea and Japan. In the mountains, it occurs to elevations of up to 1,200 meters above sea level.

The wingspan is 14–21 mm. In warm areas, adults are on wing from mid-April to the beginning of May. Males emerge three to five days prior to the females. The flight period lasts four to six weeks.

The larvae feed on Pinus sylvestris, Pinus mugo, Pinus nigra and Pinus contorta. It has also been recorded from Abies alba. If there is a serious outbreak, all buds in the upper parts of the crown of the host plant are destroyed. Outbreaks usually occur on large-scale monocultures of pine trees in flat country. Economic damage is reported from north-western Europe, Germany, the Czech Republic and Poland.
