= Endothenia polymetalla =

Scientific classification
- Domain: Eukaryota
- Kingdom: Animalia
- Phylum: Arthropoda
- Class: Insecta
- Order: Lepidoptera
- Family: Tortricidae
- Genus: Endothenia
- Species: E. polymetalla

Binomial name
- Endothenia polymetalla (Turner, 1916)

Synonyms
- Laspeyresia polymetalla Turner, 1916

Species of moth

Endothenia polymetalla is a species of moth of the family Tortricidae. It is found in Australia, where it has been recorded from Queensland.

The wingspan is about 8 mm. The forewings are whitish, mixed with brown and fuscous. There are four transverse leaden-metallic lines and a brown-and-fuscous median transverse fascia. The hindwings are grey.
