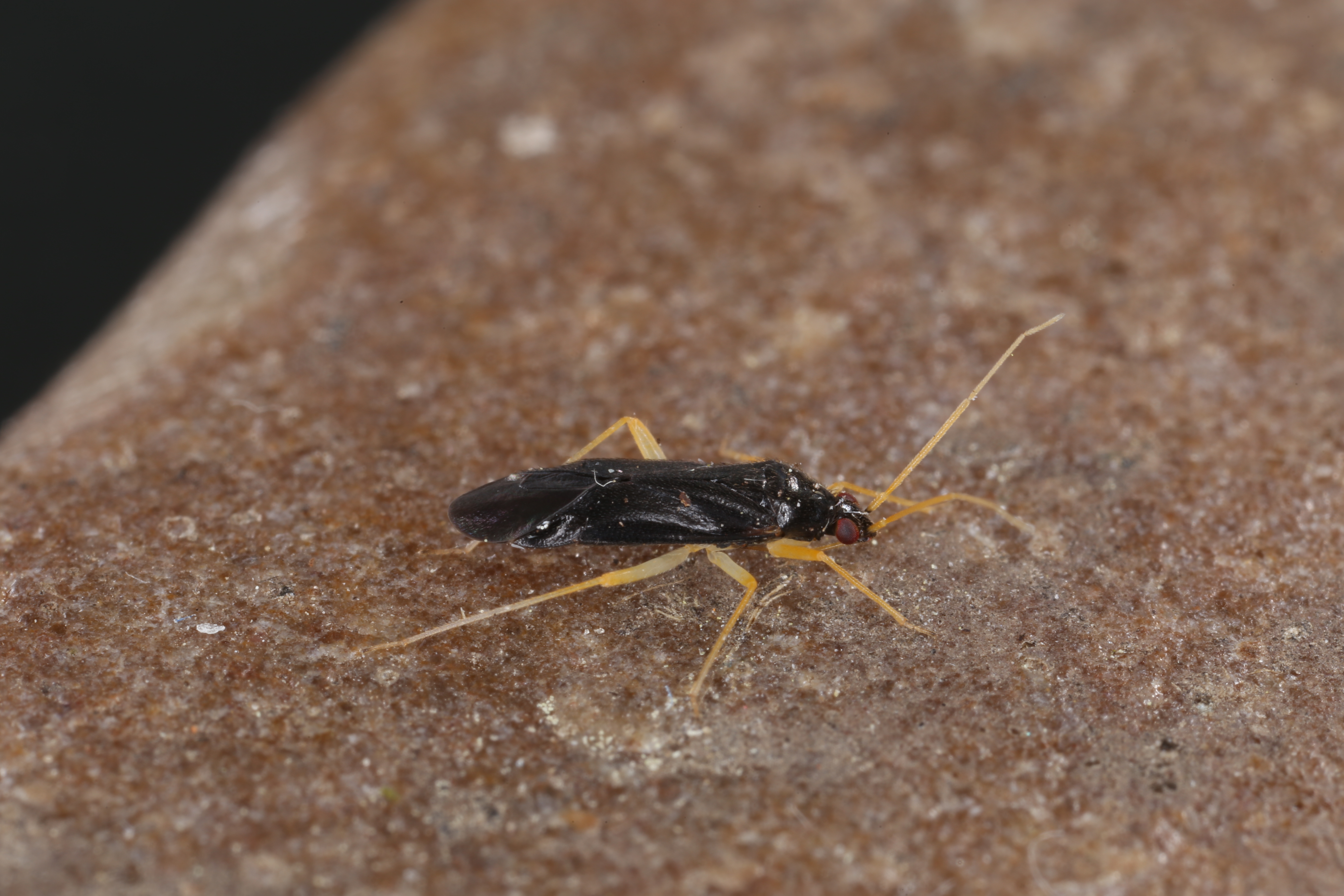

Scientific classification
- Kingdom: Animalia
- Phylum: Arthropoda
- Class: Insecta
- Order: Hemiptera
- Suborder: Heteroptera
- Family: Miridae
- Genus: Phylus
- Species: P. coryli

Binomial name
- Phylus coryli (Linnaeus, 1758)

Synonyms
- Phylus pallipes Hahn, 1831

= Phylus coryli =

Species of true bug

Phylus coryli, the hazel plant bug, is a species of plant bugs belonging to the family Miridae, subfamily Mirinae. The species is widespread in Europe including the British Isles, but missing in parts of the southern Mediterranean. To the East is found in the Caucasus. It is introduced in North America. It feeds on Corylus avellana. The species is 4.5–5.5 millimetres (0.18–0.22 in) long and is light brown to black coloured while its cuneus is reddish.
