= Endothenia citharistis =

Scientific classification
- Kingdom: Animalia
- Phylum: Arthropoda
- Class: Insecta
- Order: Lepidoptera
- Family: Tortricidae
- Genus: Endothenia
- Species: E. citharistis

Binomial name
- Endothenia citharistis (Meyrick, 1909)

Synonyms
- Argyroploce citharistis Meyrick, 1909; Endothenia citharistis Diakonoff, 1973

Species of moth

Endothenia citharistis is a moth of the family Tortricidae first described by Edward Meyrick in 1909. It is found in India, Sri Lanka, Java and Myanmar.

Its larval food plant is Lagerstroemia.
