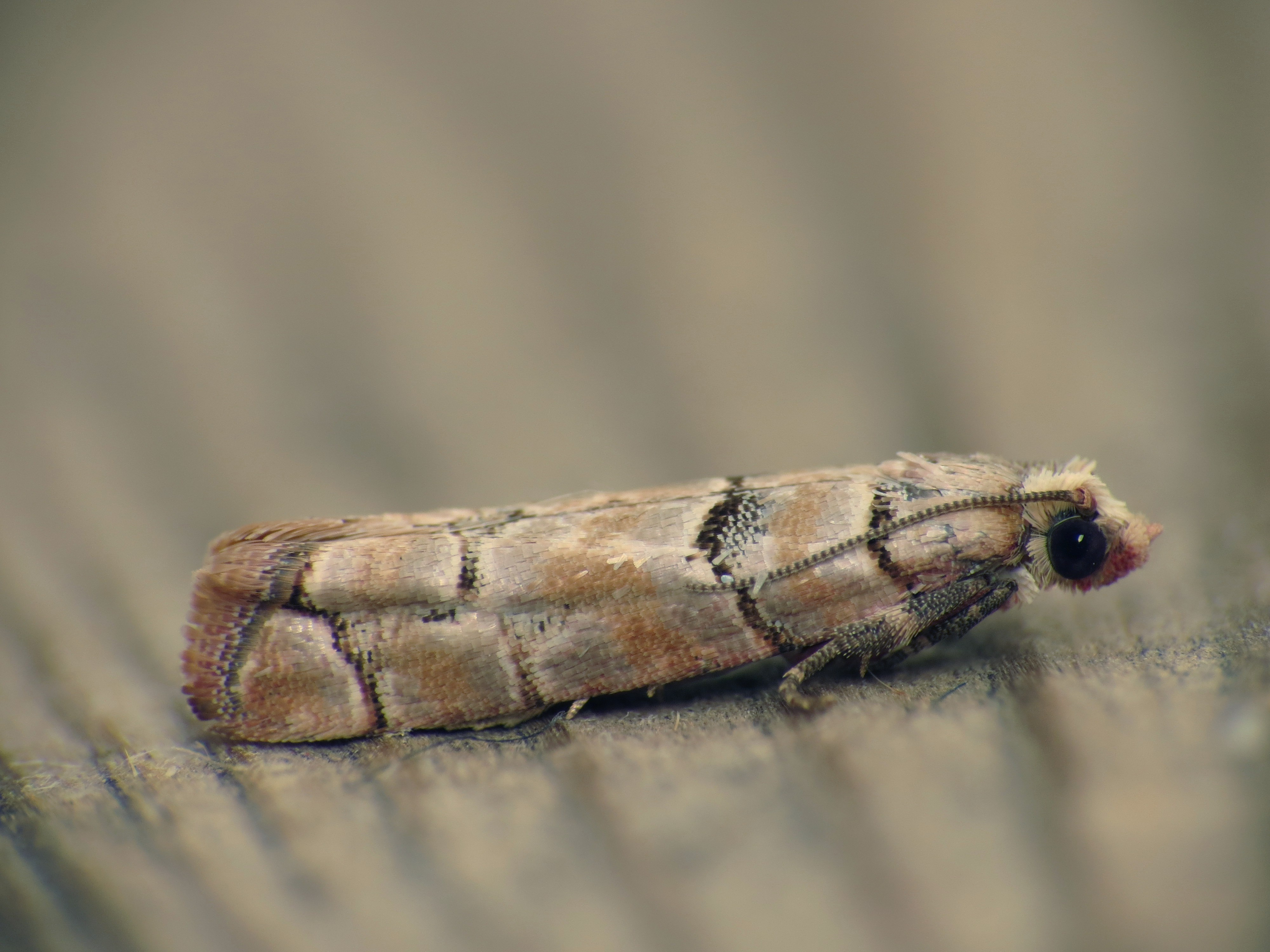

Scientific classification
- Domain: Eukaryota
- Kingdom: Animalia
- Phylum: Arthropoda
- Class: Insecta
- Order: Lepidoptera
- Family: Tortricidae
- Genus: Blastesthia
- Species: B. tessulatana

Binomial name
- Blastesthia tessulatana (Staudinger, 1871)

Synonyms
- Retinia tessulatana Staudinger, 1871; Pseudoccyx tessulatana

= Blastesthia tessulatana =

Cone tortricid

Species of moth

Blastesthia tessulatana, the cone tortricid, is a species of moth of the family Tortricidae. It is found in the Near East, North Africa, Portugal, Spain, France, Germany, Italy, Switzerland, Albania, Bulgaria, Greece and on Malta, Sicily, Sardinia and Cyprus.

The wingspan is 13–17 mm. Adults are on wing from April to August.

The larvae feed on Cupressaceae species, including Cupressus sempervirens. They feed on the cones of their host plant. Larvae can be found from September to April.
