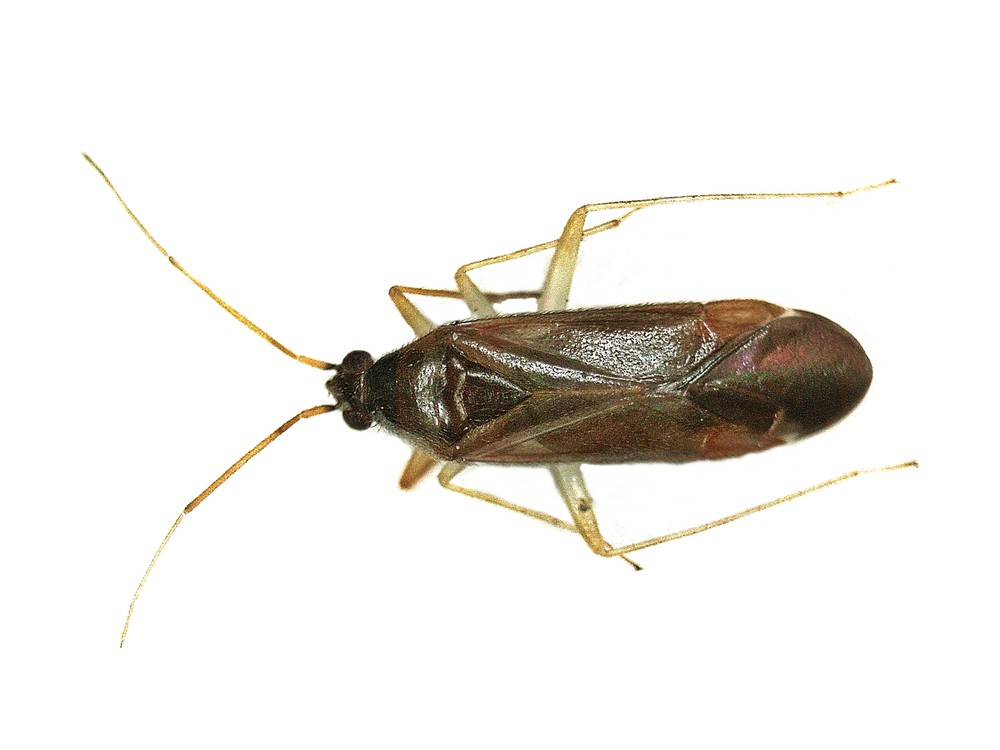
- Phylus coryli

Scientific classification
- Domain: Eukaryota
- Kingdom: Animalia
- Phylum: Arthropoda
- Class: Insecta
- Order: Hemiptera
- Suborder: Heteroptera
- Family: Miridae
- Tribe: Phylini
- Genus: Phylus; Hahn, 1831

= Phylus =

Genus of true bugs

Phylus is a genus of true bugs belonging to the family Miridae.

The species of this genus are found in Europe and Japan.

== Species ==
BioLib includes:

subgenus Phylus Hahn, 1831

1. Phylus coryli (Linnaeus, 1758) - type species (syn. P. pallipes Hahn, 1758)
2. Phylus limbatellus Poppius, 1912
3. Phylus melanocephalus (Linnaeus, 1767)
4. Phylus nigriscapus Kerzhner, 1988

subgenus Teratoscopus Fieber, 1861

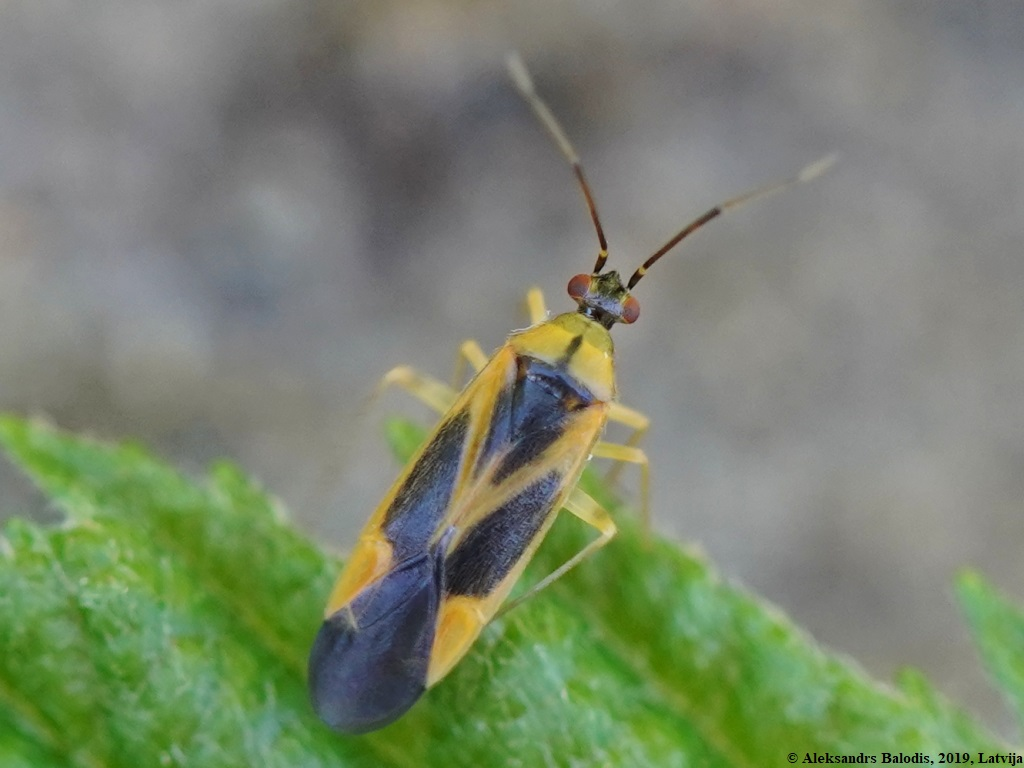
P. plagiatus

1. Phylus breviceps Reuter, 1899
2. Phylus coryloides Josifov & Kerzhner, 1972
3. Phylus miyamotoi Yasunaga, 1999
4. Phylus plagiatus (Herrich-Schäffer, 1835)
