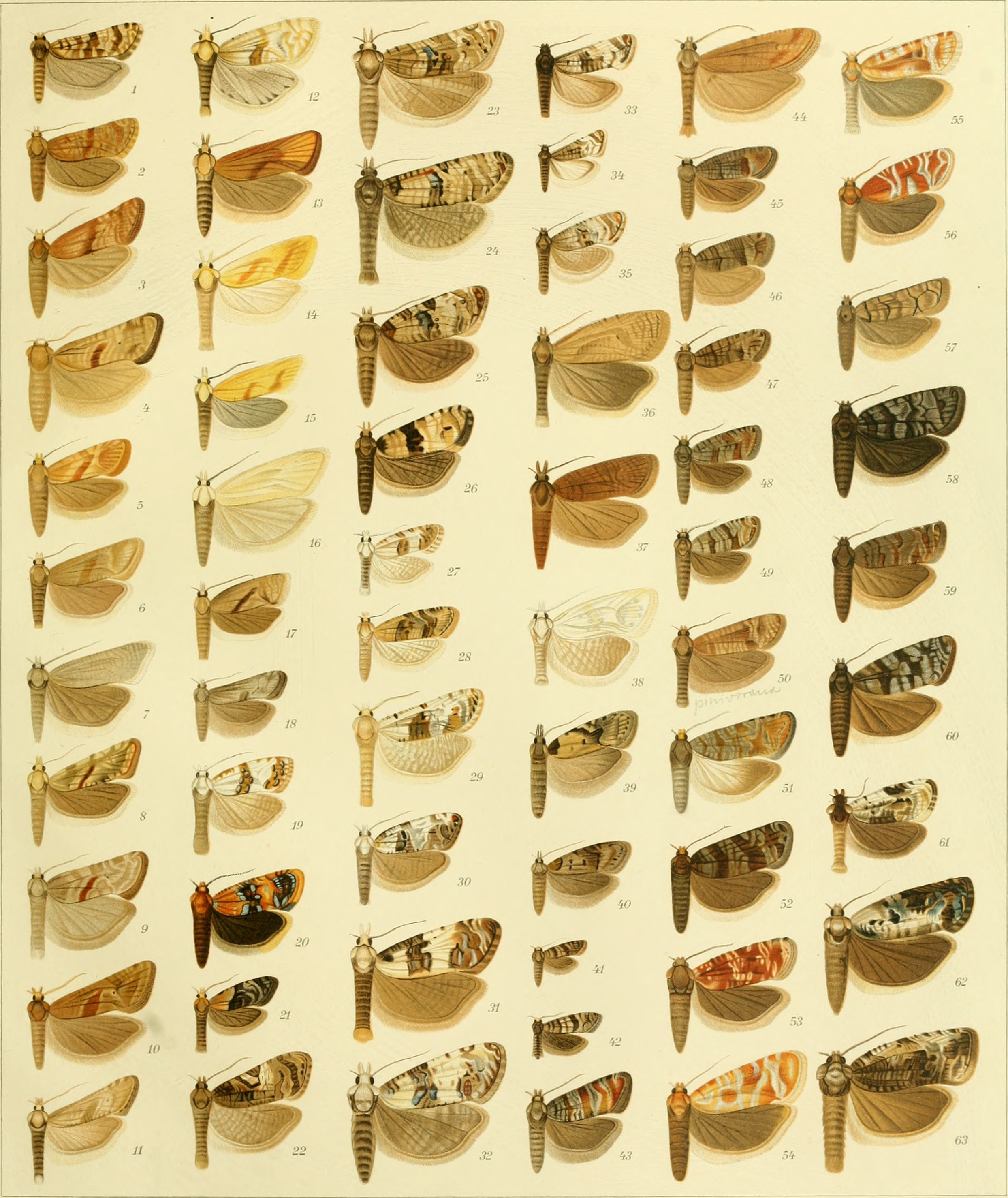
- Blastesthia posticana in Kennel Die palaearktischen tortriciden figures 48,49 females

Scientific classification
- Domain: Eukaryota
- Kingdom: Animalia
- Phylum: Arthropoda
- Class: Insecta
- Order: Lepidoptera
- Family: Tortricidae
- Genus: Blastesthia
- Species: B. posticana

Binomial name
- Blastesthia posticana Zetterstedt, 1839

Synonyms
- Coccyx posticana; Pseudococcyx posticana (Zetterstedt, 1839); Retinia fulvimitrana Heinemann, 1863; Coccyx mulsantiana Nrdlinger, 1848

= Blastesthia posticana =

Species of moth

Blastesthia posticana is a moth of the family Tortricidae. It is found from northern and central Europe to eastern Russia.

The wingspan is 11–16 mm.

Adults are on wing in May and June. There is one generation per year.

The larvae feed on Pinus sylvestris.
