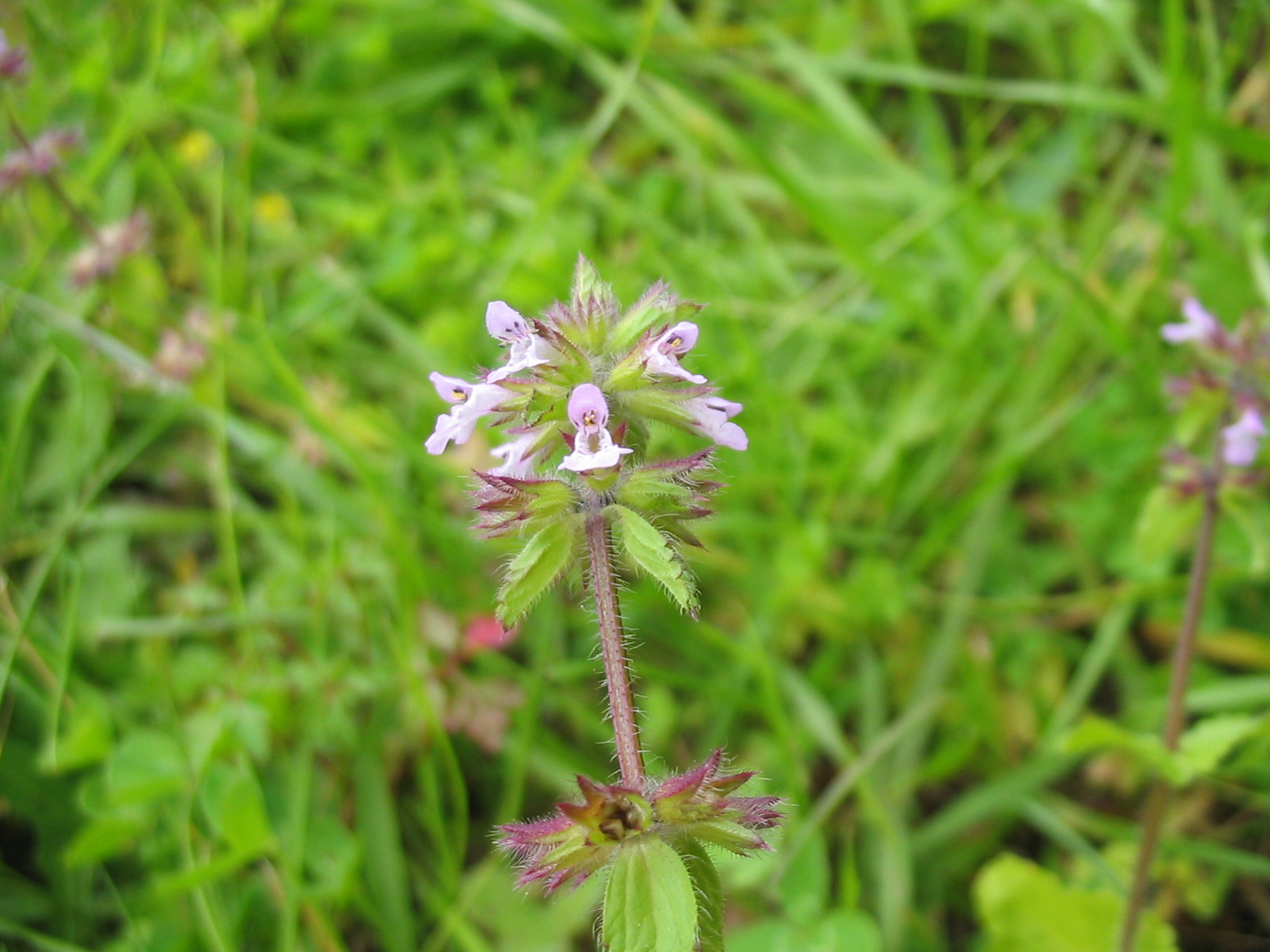

Scientific classification
- Kingdom: Plantae
- Clade: Tracheophytes
- Clade: Angiosperms
- Clade: Eudicots
- Clade: Asterids
- Order: Lamiales
- Family: Lamiaceae
- Genus: Stachys
- Species: S. arvensis

Binomial name
- Stachys arvensis L.

= Stachys arvensis =

Species of flowering plant

Stachys arvensis is a species of flowering plant in the mint family known by the common names field woundwort and staggerweed. It is native to Europe, Western Asia, and North Africa. It is known on other continents as an introduced species and widespread weed.

== Description ==
Field woundwort is an annual herb with branched, square stems up to 45 cm long, growing with a sprawling or erect habit. The stems are pale green and covered with patent, sparsely glandular hairs up to 2 mm long. Plants are easily uprooted to reveal a mass of short, white, fibrous roots at the base of the plant and sometimes along any horizontal stems close to the base. The leaves are arranged in opposite, decussate pairs, with no stipules, and petioles of up to 4 cm long; the blade is simple and oval, up to 4 cm long, with a truncate base and between 7 and 12 rounded teeth per side. They are dull, medium green on the upper surface and paler beneath, hairy on both sides.

The inflorescence consists of a terminal spike with up to 8 false whorls (actually two opposite clusters that look like a whorl) of 4 to 7 flowers, each with a short pedicel of up to 1.5 mm. The whorls are subtended by a pair of leaf-like bracts which are stalked at the base of the inflorescence, becoming sessile towards the top of the plant. There is also one tiny bracteole at the base of each cluster of flowers. The lower whorls are widely spaced, but the upper ones are more crowded towards the tip of the plant. The flowers are zygomorphic with a 5 lobed calyx tube 5 to 7 mm long, and two lipped corolla 6 to 8 mm. The upper lip is entire and the lower lip is three lobed, with the central lobe much larger. It can be white, pink or purple.

== Habitat and ecology ==
It grows in many types of habitat, including disturbed areas, and often in moist spots.

== Taxonomy ==
Stachys arvensis was described by Linnaeus in 1763. The common name staggerweed is because the plant is poisonous to livestock and causes livestock to stagger around.

== Uses ==
As its common name 'field woundwort' suggests, this herb has been used since Roman times in healing wounds, and its seeds, scattered by Roman soldiers, mark the lines of Roman roads. Its close relatives hedge woundwort and marsh woundwort are also used to treat wounds.
