= Endothenia euryteles =

Scientific classification
- Kingdom: Animalia
- Phylum: Arthropoda
- Class: Insecta
- Order: Lepidoptera
- Family: Tortricidae
- Genus: Endothenia
- Species: E. euryteles

Binomial name
- Endothenia euryteles (Meyrick, 1936)

Synonyms
- Laspeyresia euryteles Meyrick, 1936; Cydia euryteles

Species of moth

Endothenia euryteles is a species of moth of the family Tortricidae found in the Democratic Republic of Congo. The larvae feed on Geophila species.
