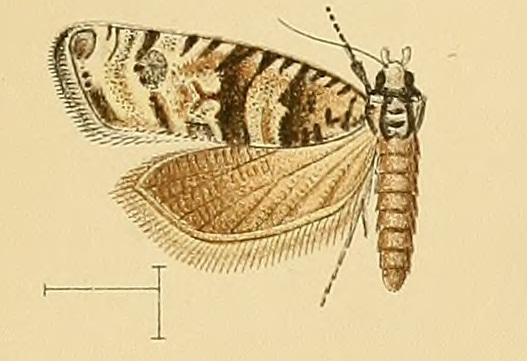

Scientific classification
- Domain: Eukaryota
- Kingdom: Animalia
- Phylum: Arthropoda
- Class: Insecta
- Order: Lepidoptera
- Family: Tortricidae
- Genus: Endothenia
- Species: E. pauperculana

Binomial name
- Endothenia pauperculana (Staudinger, 1859)

Synonyms
- Penthina pauperculana Staudinger, 1859; Eucelis marrubiana Walsingham, 1907; Grapholitha nougatana Chretien, 1898; Polychrosis schmidti Rebel, 1936; Grapholitha nougatana var. sideritana Chretien, 1917

= Endothenia pauperculana =

Species of moth

Endothenia pauperculana is a moth of the family Tortricidae. It is found in France, Switzerland, Italy, Portugal, Spain as well as on Sardinia and in the Canary Islands.

The wingspan is 11–13 mm. Adults have been recorded flying in April and from June to July.

The larvae feed on Marrubium vulgare and Sideritis hirsuta.
