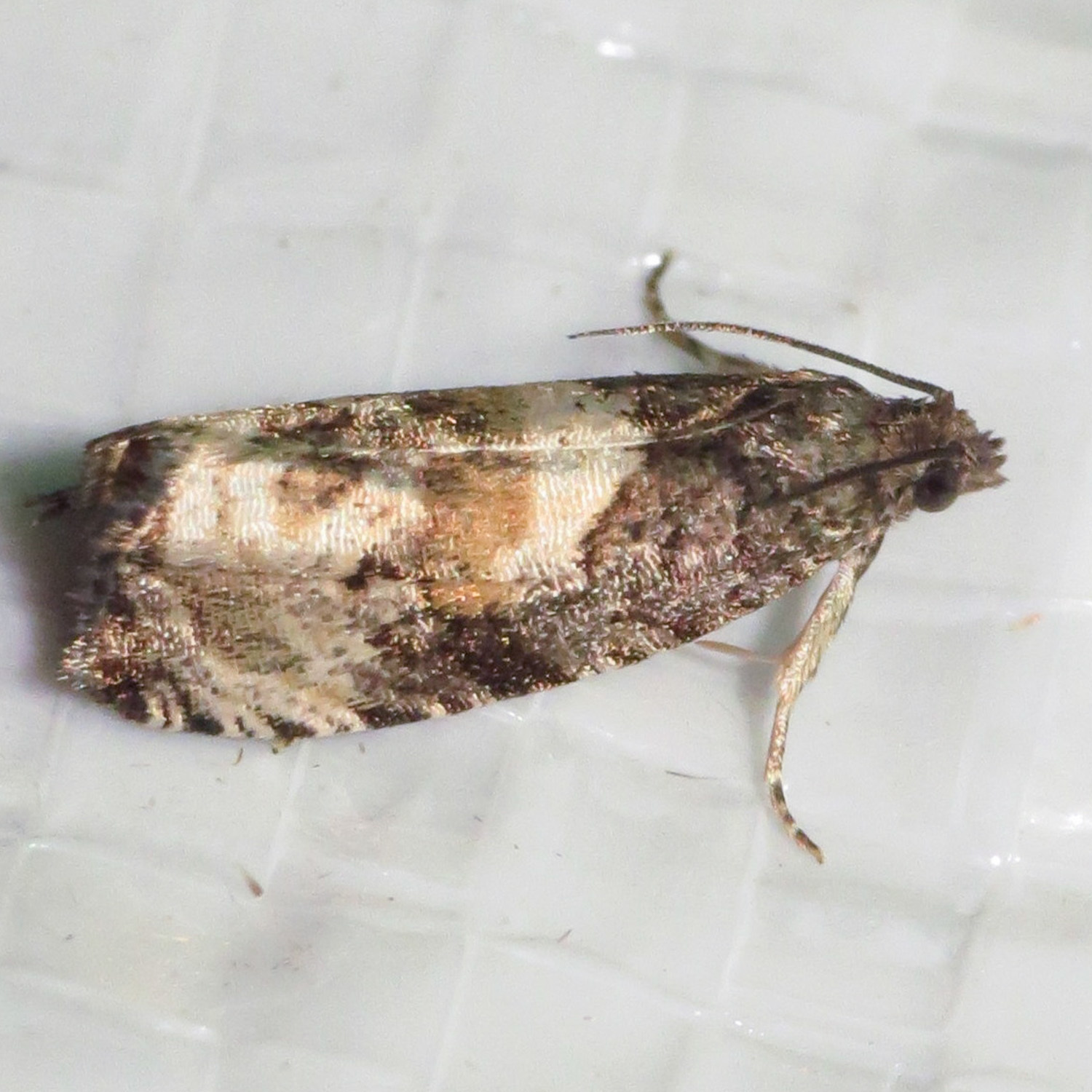
- Hulda impudens, Maine

Scientific classification
- Kingdom: Animalia
- Phylum: Arthropoda
- Class: Insecta
- Order: Lepidoptera
- Family: Tortricidae
- Subfamily: Olethreutinae
- Tribe: Olethreutini
- Genus: Hulda; Heinrich, 1926
- Species: H. impudens

Binomial name
- Hulda impudens (Walsingham, 1884)

Synonyms
- Penthina impudens Walsingham, 1884

= Hulda impudens =

Species of moth

Hulda is a genus of moths belonging to the family Tortricidae. It contains only one species, Hulda impudens, which is found in North America, including North Carolina and Saskatchewan.

The wingspan is 13–14 mm (0.51–0.55 in).

== See also ==
- List of Tortricidae genera
