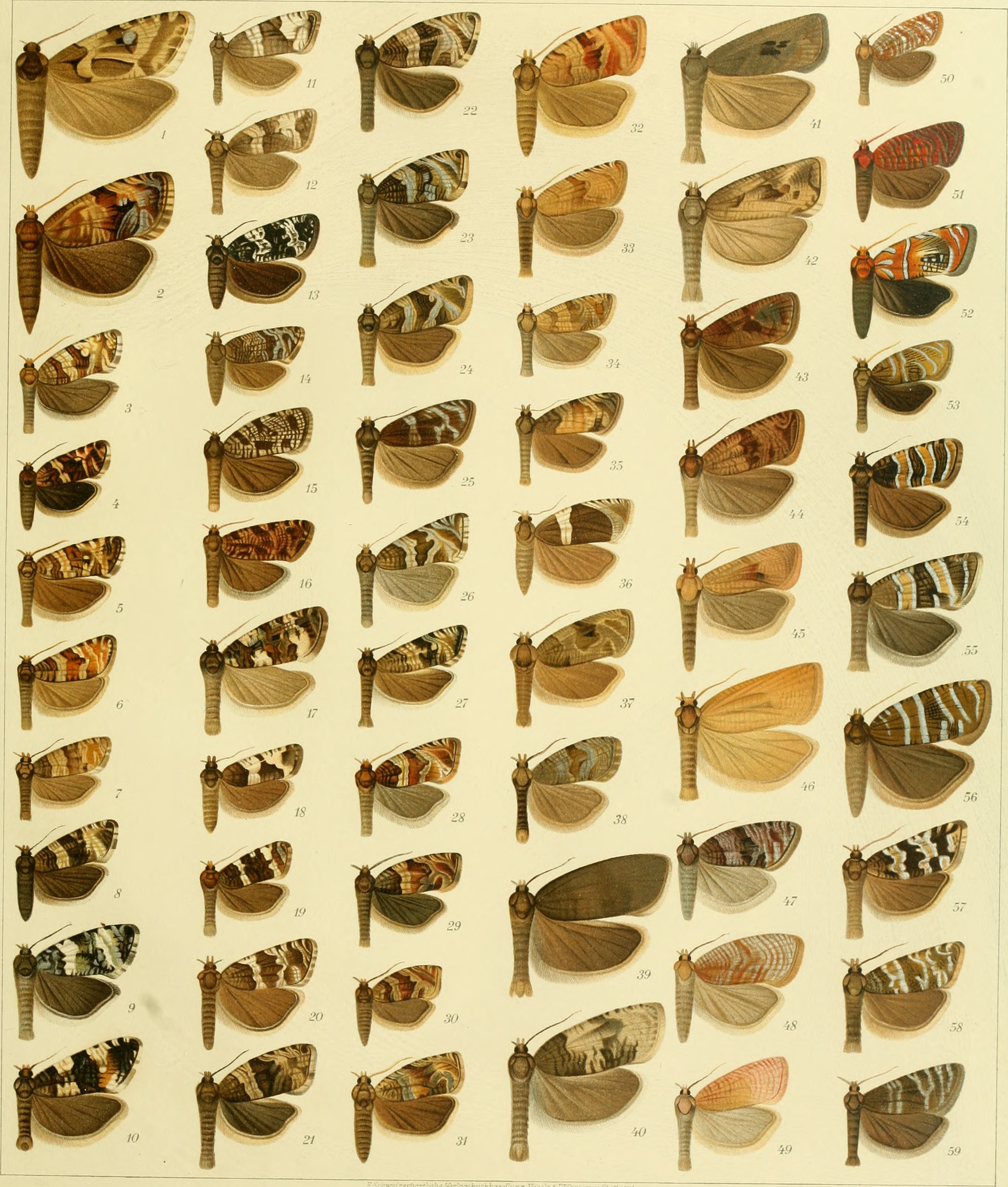
- Tia enervana in Kennel Die palaearktischen tortriciden male figure 12

Scientific classification
- Domain: Eukaryota
- Kingdom: Animalia
- Phylum: Arthropoda
- Class: Insecta
- Order: Lepidoptera
- Family: Tortricidae
- Subfamily: Olethreutinae
- Tribe: Olethreutini
- Genus: Tia; Heinrich, 1926
- Species: T. enervana

Binomial name
- Tia enervana (Erschoff, 1877)

Synonyms
- Penthina enervana Erschoff, 1877; Argyroploce vulgana McDunnough, 1922

= Tia enervana =

Species of moth

Tia is a genus of moths belonging to the subfamily Olethreutinae of the family Tortricidae. It contains only one species, Tia enervana, which has been recorded from Russia (Siberia) and Canada (Alberta).

The wingspan is 13–18 mm.

== See also ==
- List of Tortricidae genera
