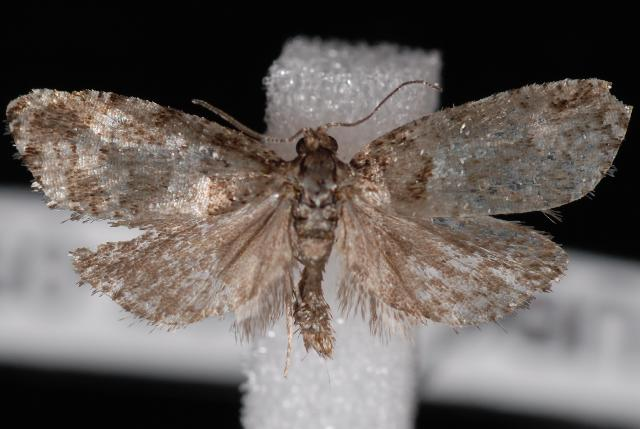

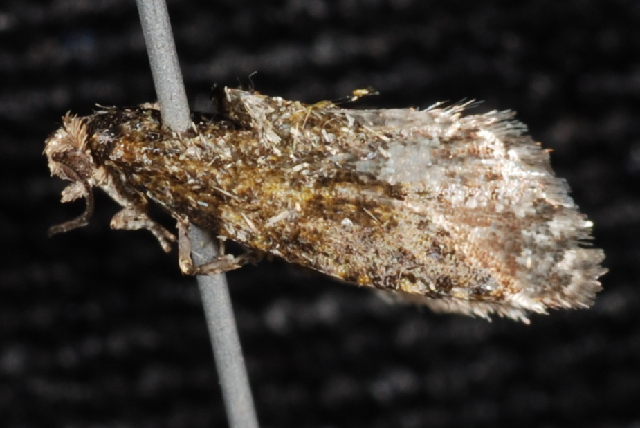

Scientific classification
- Domain: Eukaryota
- Kingdom: Animalia
- Phylum: Arthropoda
- Class: Insecta
- Order: Lepidoptera
- Family: Tortricidae
- Tribe: Endotheniini
- Genus: Taniva; Heinrich, 1926
- Species: T. albolineana

Binomial name
- Taniva albolineana (Kearfott, 1907)

Synonyms
- Lipoptycha albolineana Kearfott, 1907; Endothenia albolineana; Argyroploce abietana Fernald, 1908; Olethreutes piceae Busck, 1916

= Taniva =

Genus and species of tortrix moth

Taniva is a monotypic moth genus belonging to the family Tortricidae erected by Carl Heinrich in 1926. Its only species, Taniva albolineana, the spruce needleminer moth, was first described by William D. Kearfott in 1907.

== Distribution ==
It is found in the northern United States and Canada.

== Description ==
The wingspan is about 12 mm.

== Gallery ==
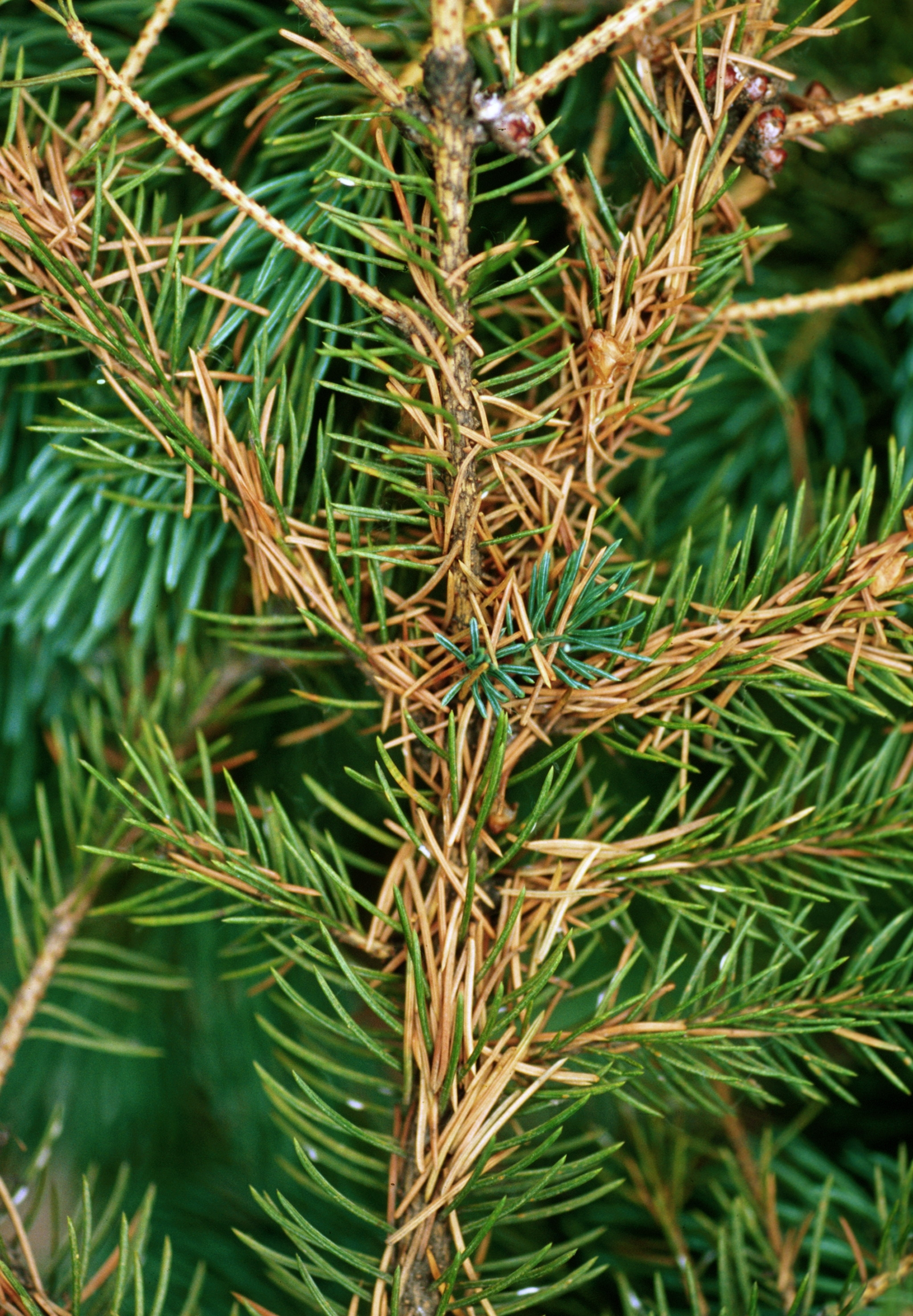
Damage

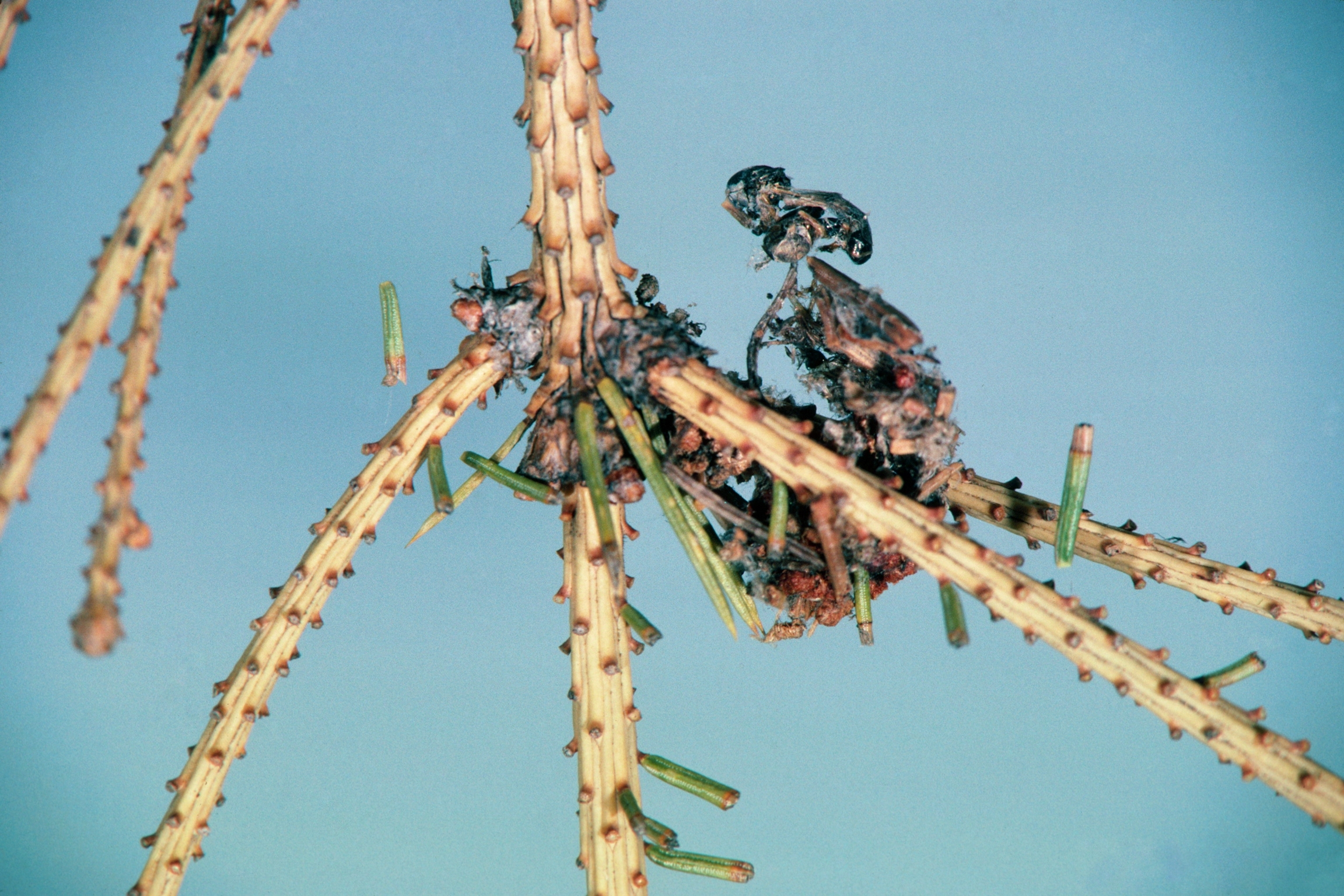
Adults emerging

== See also ==
- List of Tortricidae genera
