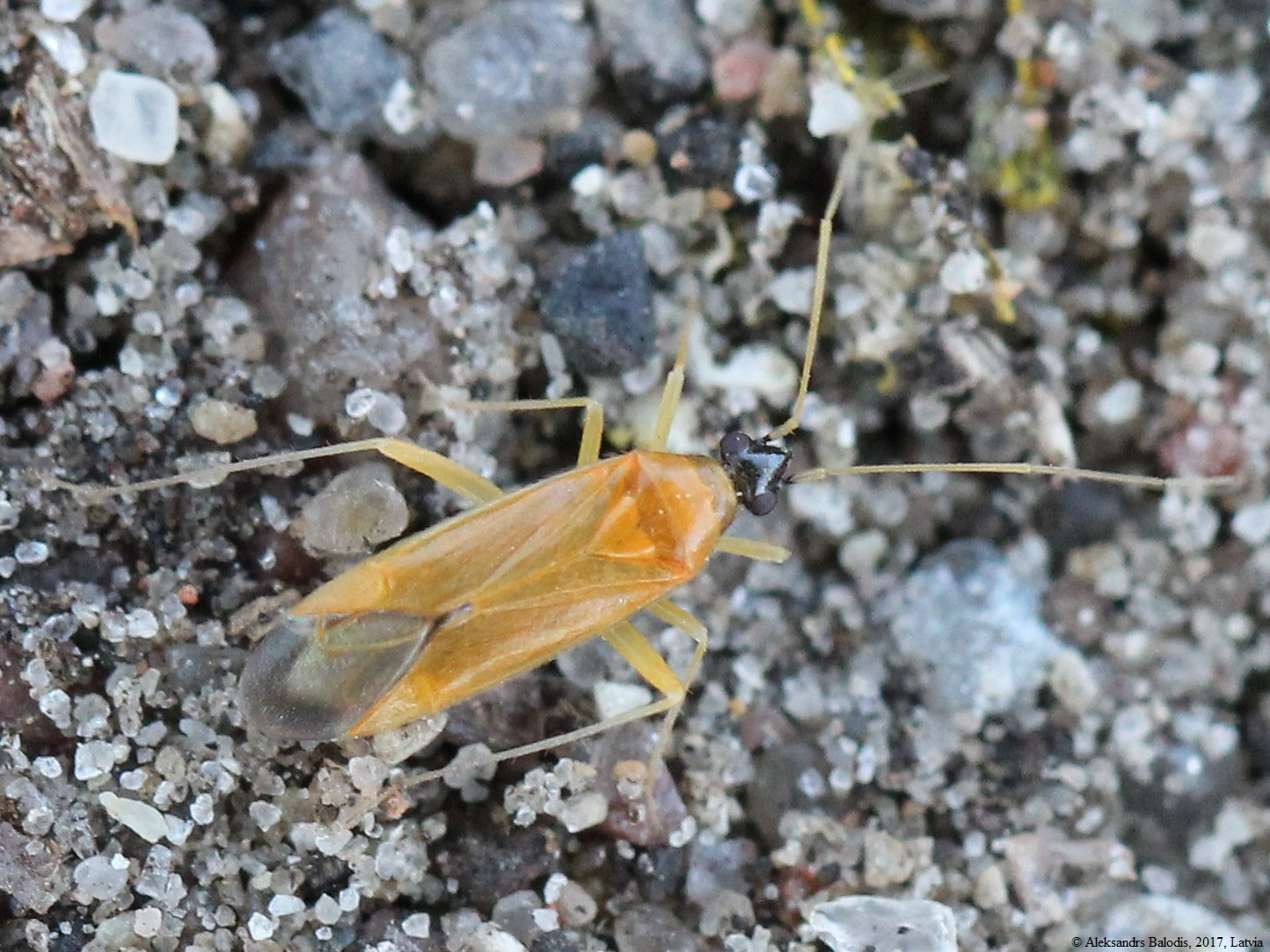

Scientific classification
- Kingdom: Animalia
- Phylum: Arthropoda
- Class: Insecta
- Order: Hemiptera
- Suborder: Heteroptera
- Family: Miridae
- Subfamily: Phylinae
- Tribe: Phylini
- Genus: Phylus
- Species: P. melanocephalus

Binomial name
- Phylus melanocephalus (Linnaeus, 1767)

Synonyms
- Cimex melanocephalus Linnaeus, 1767; Phylus palliceps Fieber, 1861

= Phylus melanocephalus =

Species of true bug

Phylus melanocephalus is a European species of plant bugs belonging to the family Miridae, subfamily Phylinae. It is a slender bug 4.5–6 millimetres (0.18–0.24 in) long and feeds on oak trees. Its colour ranges from orange to greenish-brown and its head may be pale or dark.

== "Phylus palliceps" ==
Paler specimens of P. melanocephalus were long referred to as separate species Phylus palliceps, distinguished in particular by having a pale head, P. melanocephalus being restricted to insects with a dark head. Pagola-Carte et al. (2005) found no morphological or habitat differences between specimens referred to the two supposed species, and a continuous gradation of colour, and concluded the two should be synonymised.
