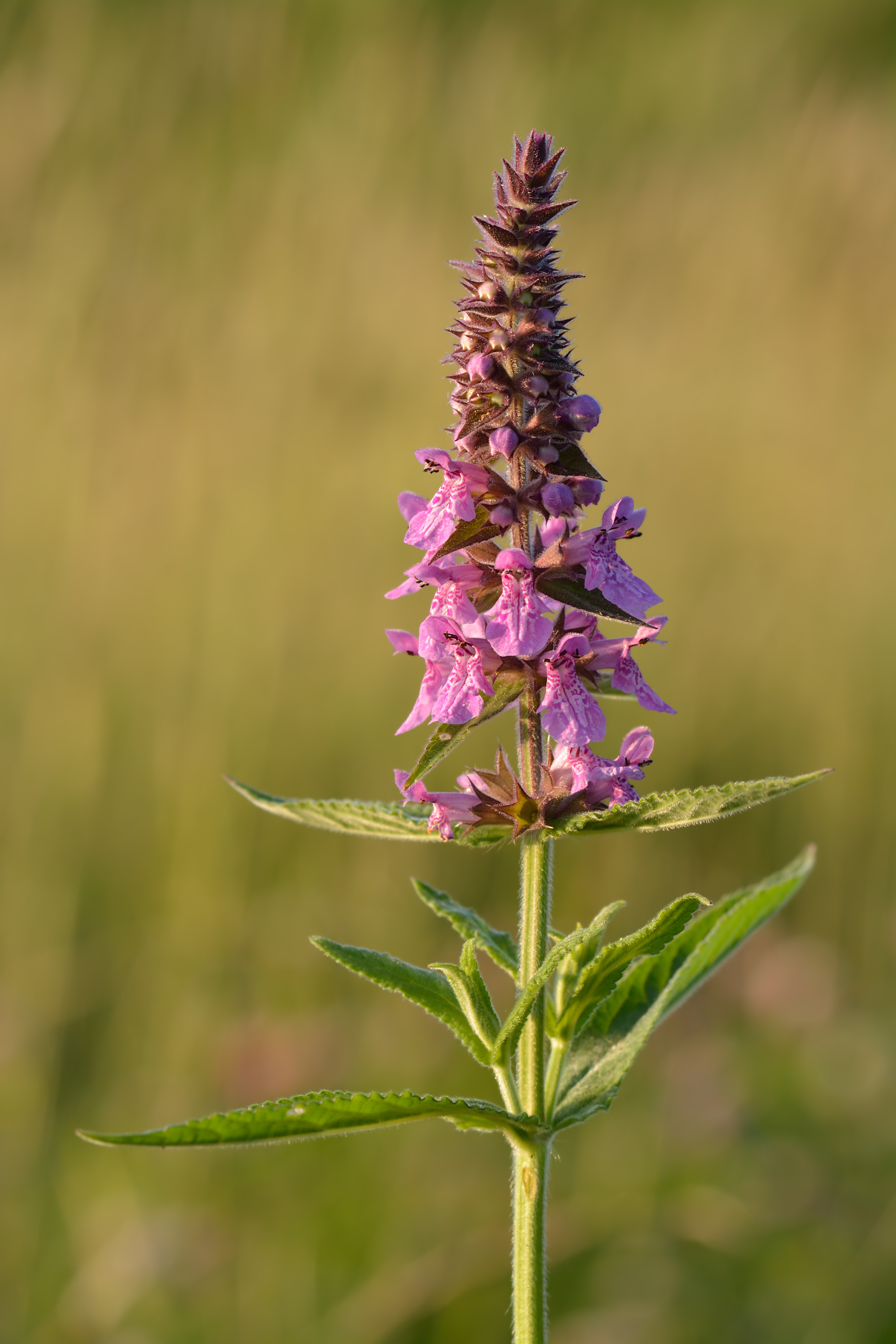

Conservation status
- Least Concern (IUCN 3.1)

Scientific classification
- Kingdom: Plantae
- Clade: Tracheophytes
- Clade: Angiosperms
- Clade: Eudicots
- Clade: Asterids
- Order: Lamiales
- Family: Lamiaceae
- Genus: Stachys
- Species: S. palustris

Binomial name
- Stachys palustris L.

Synonyms
- Stachys aquatica Bubani; Stachys austriaca Heynh.; Stachys maeotica Postrig.; Stachys segetum Hagen; Stachys wolgensis Wilensky

= Stachys palustris =

Plant species in the mint family

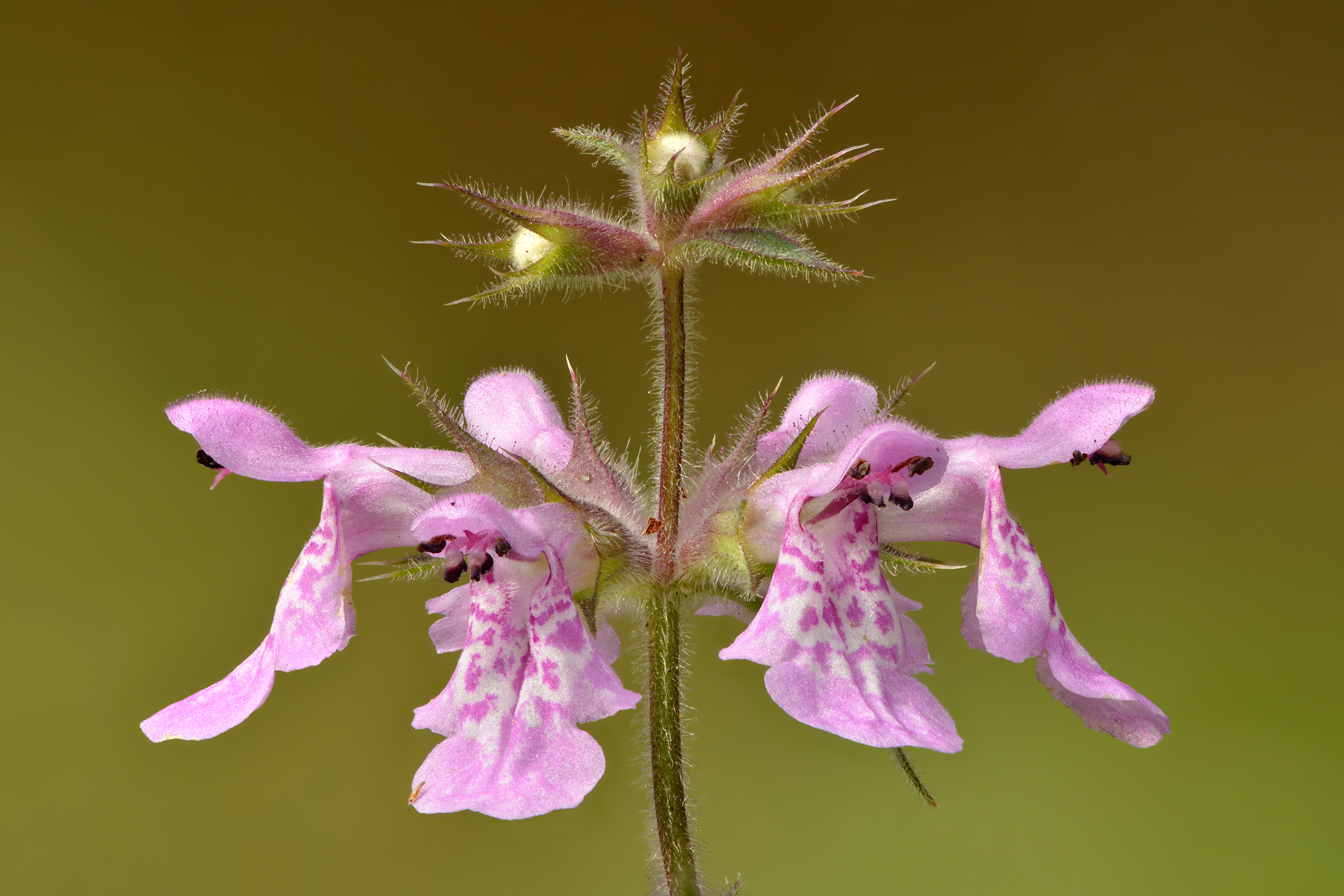
Inflorescence

Stachys palustris, commonly known as marsh woundwort, marsh betony, clown's woundwort, clown's heal-all, marsh hedgenettle, or hedge-nettle, is an edible perennial grassland herb growing to 80 centimeters tall. It is native to parts of Eurasia but has been introduced to North America. The species epithet palustris is Latin for "of the marsh" and indicates its common habitat.

== Description ==
Marsh woundwort is a perennial plant growing from a horizontal tuberous runner. It has square stems with opposite pairs of leaves that are almost stalkless, linearly lanceolate, slightly cordate at the base and toothed. The calyx has five sharply-pointed lobes. The purplish-red flowers are in terminal spikes, with gaps in the lower part of the spike. They are arranged in whorls, each flower consisting of five fused petals, the corolla being two-lipped, the upper lip being gently hooded and the lower lip flat and three-lobed. The flowers are mostly visited by bumblebees. There are four stamens, two long and two short and the fruit is a dry four-chambered schizocarp.

== Distribution and habitat ==
The marsh woundwort is native to Europe and Asia. Its typical habitat is near the shore of lakes, in marshes with alder trees, on the banks of ditches and streams, in damp meadows, in arable ground and in waste places. In arable land, it is a difficult weed to get rid of because of its persistent tubers.

== Ecology ==
Although the marsh woundwort has little fragrance, it is very attractive to bumblebees. Nectar indicators guide the insect to probe into the centre of the flower and the anthers of the stamens and the pistils are correctly located for the insect to transfer pollen between flowers. The seeds of this plant disperse well, the dry fruit capsules float away and this probably why the plant is frequently found on the banks of lakes and other bodies of water. It also spreads vegetatively by means of hollow tuberous root which can throw up shoots far from the original plant.

== Uses ==
As their common names suggest, along with its close relatives field woundwort and hedge woundwort it is used to promote the healing of wounds. Wort is a middle English word for an herb or vegetable.
