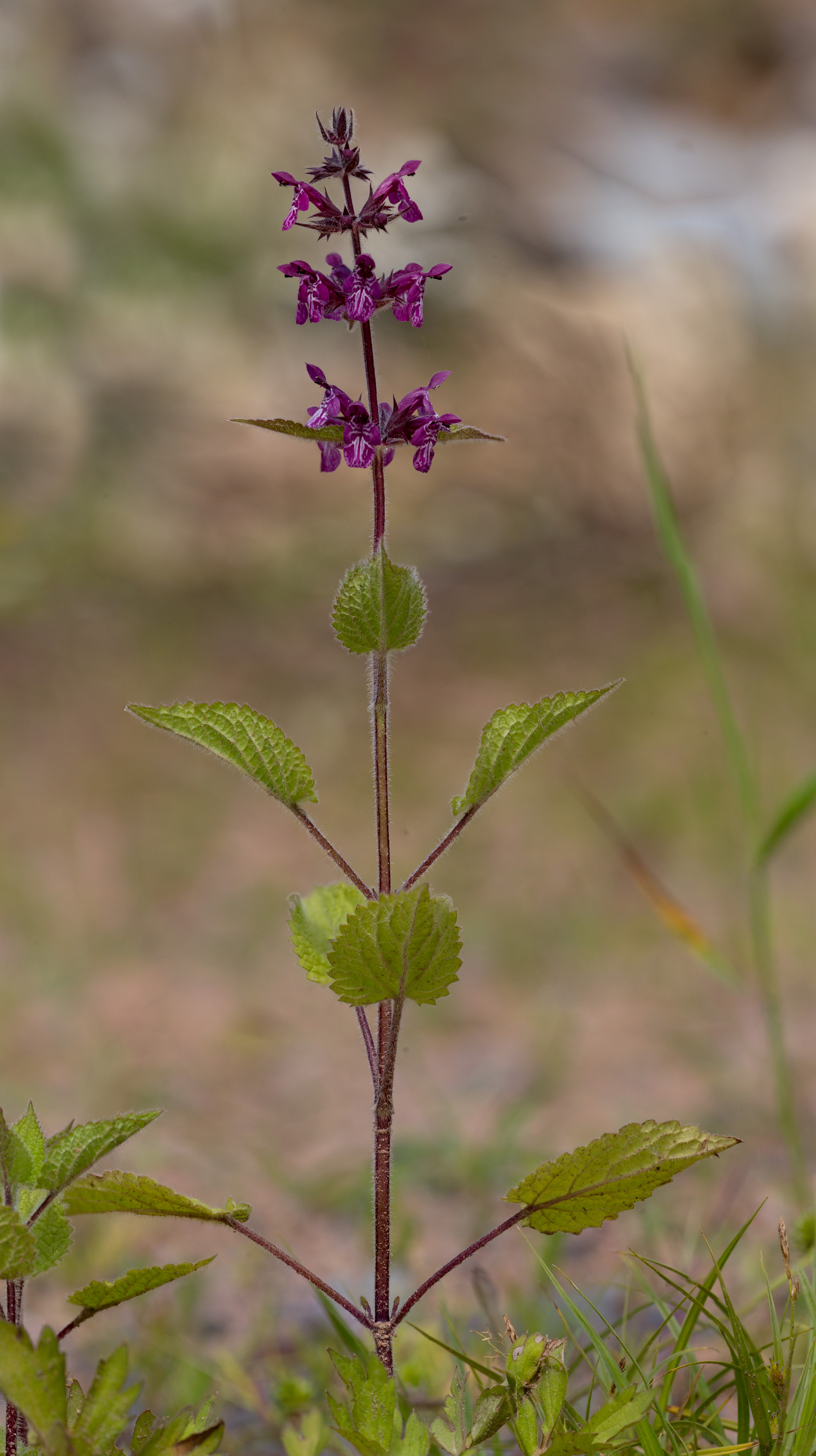

Scientific classification
- Kingdom: Plantae
- Clade: Tracheophytes
- Clade: Angiosperms
- Clade: Eudicots
- Clade: Asterids
- Order: Lamiales
- Family: Lamiaceae
- Genus: Stachys
- Species: S. sylvatica

Binomial name
- Stachys sylvatica L.

= Stachys sylvatica =

Species of herb

Stachys sylvatica, commonly known as hedge woundwort, whitespot, or sometimes as hedge nettle, is a perennial herbaceous plant growing to 80 cm (31 in) tall in woodland and unmanaged grassland. In temperate zones of the northern hemisphere it flowers in July and August. The flowers are purple. The leaves, when crushed or bruised, give off an unpleasant fetid smell.

== Description ==
Hedge woundwort is an erect perennial plant with slender underground runners. The stem branches occasionally and is squarish and hairy, with glandular hairs on the upper part of the plant. The nodes are widely spaced, and the mid-green, stalked leaves are in opposite pairs. The leaf blades are hairy, have a cordate base and are ovate with a blunt tip and with regular large teeth on the margin. The inflorescence forms a dense terminal spike and is composed of dense whorls of purple flowers with white markings. The calyx has five lobes and the corolla forms a two-lipped flower about 12 to 18 mm (0.47 to 0.71 in) long with a fused tube. The upper lip of each flower is convex with dense, glandular hairs and the lower lip is three-lobed, the central lobe being the largest. There are four stamens, two long and two short, the gynoecium has two fused carpels and the fruit is a four-chambered schizocarp. The plant has a slightly unpleasant smell.

== Distribution and habitat ==
Hedge woundwort is native to Europe and central and western Asia. It grows in dappled shade at the edge of woods, in hedgerows and on rough ground. It has been introduced into New York state, Ontario, and New Zealand.

== Uses ==
Hedge woundwort is popular with bees. Along with its close relatives field woundwort and marsh woundwort, as their common names suggest, they are used to promote the healing of wounds. The famous 17th century herbalist John Gerard was very impressed with its powers and used it extensively.
