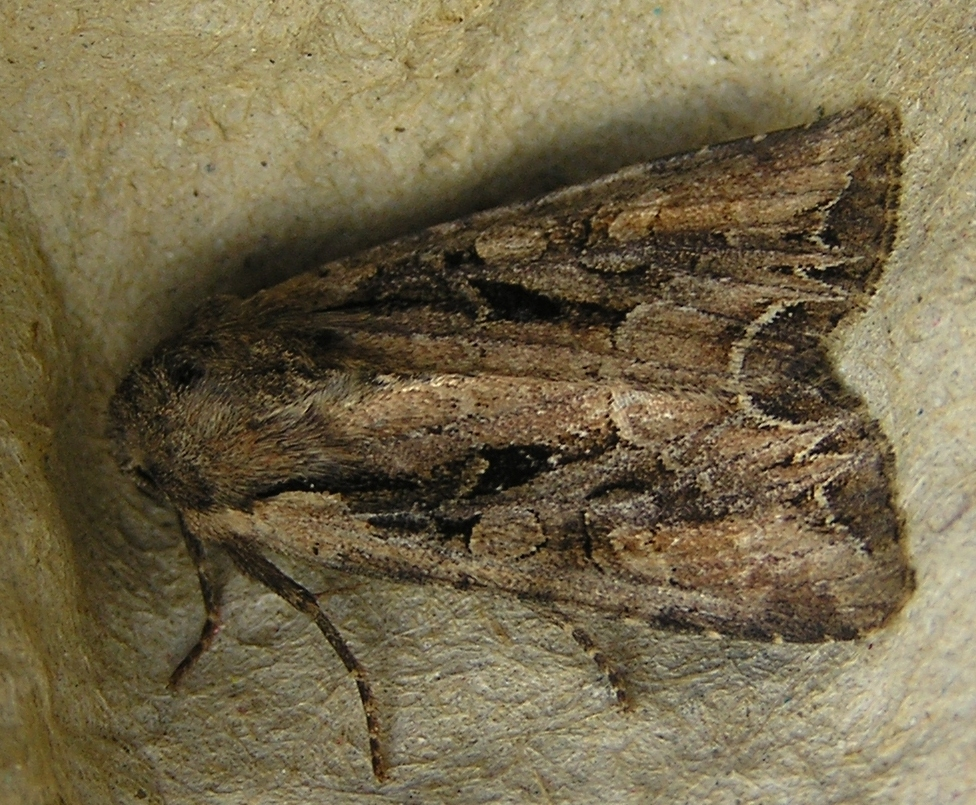

Scientific classification
- Domain: Eukaryota
- Kingdom: Animalia
- Phylum: Arthropoda
- Class: Insecta
- Order: Lepidoptera
- Superfamily: Noctuoidea
- Family: Noctuidae
- Genus: Lacanobia
- Species: L. halassina

Binomial name
- Lacanobia halassina (Hufnagel, 1766)

= Lacanobia thalassina =

Species of moth

Lacanobia thalassina, the pale-shouldered brocade, is a moth of the family Noctuidae. It is found in Europe east across the Palearctic to the Russian Far East and Siberia.

== Technical description and variation ==
The wingspan is 35–38 mm. The length of the forewings is 16–20 mm. Has no pale grey tints; the red-brown ground colour varying only to dark grey; the claviform (club-shaped) stigma is produced as a dark dash to outer line; upper stigmata pale with partial black outlines, a black basal streak with pale patch above it; hindwing pale fuscous, paler at base; the form achates Hbn. has the forewing uniform red brown; while humeralis Haw. is fuscous grey with the red tints absent; ab. nigrifusa nov. [Warren] is wholly suffused with black, the orbicular stigma and traces of outer and submarginal lines remaining pale grey.

Similar species In Lacanobia suasa and Lacanobia w-latinum, the W sign of the wavy line extends to the fringes.

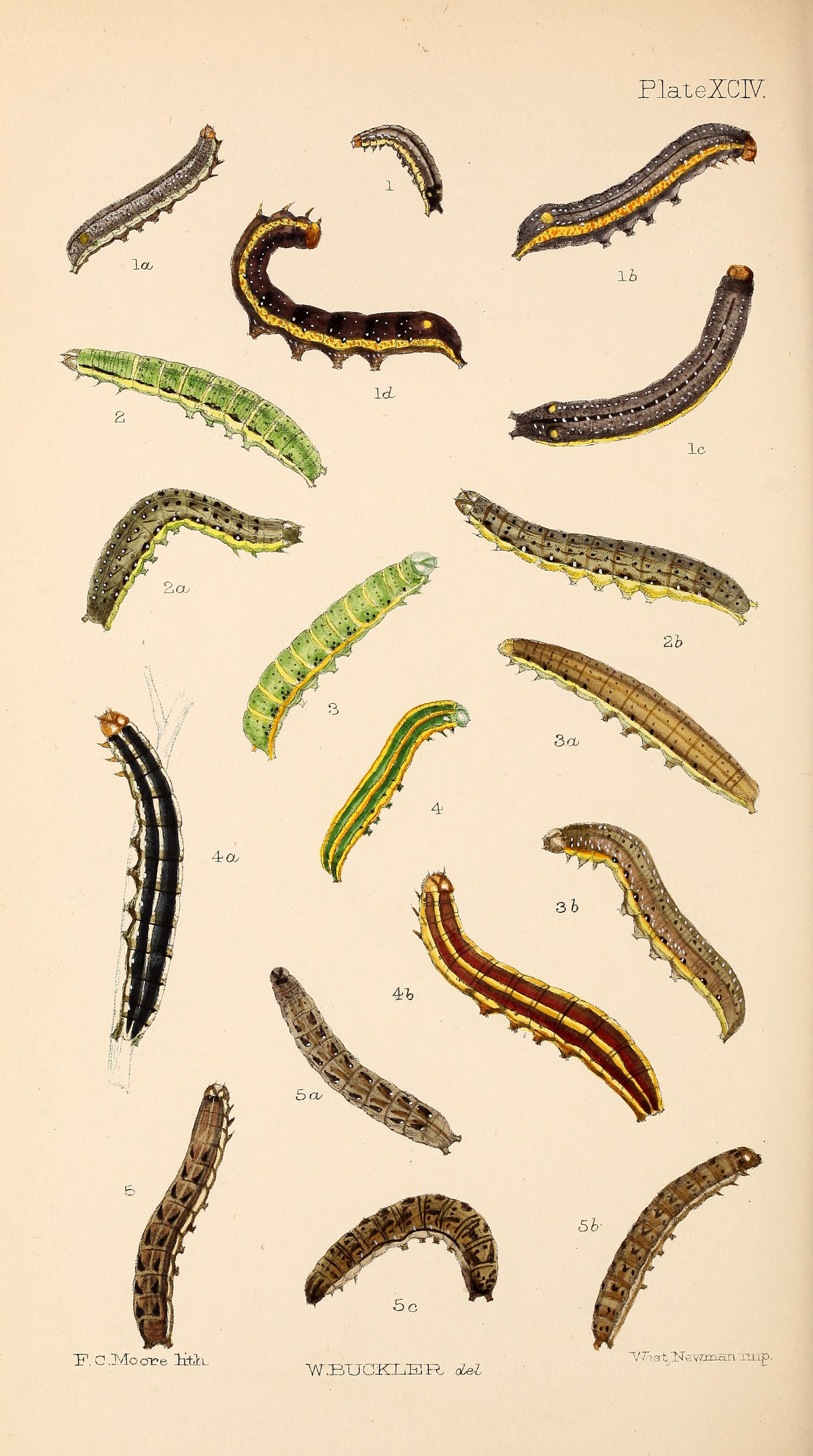
Figs.5, 5a, 5b, 5c larva after last moult

== Biology ==
The moth flies in two generations from early May to September.

Larva green or reddish yellow, with two dark oblique stripes on each segment, with two dark spots or blotches in front of them; lateral lines pale grey with red edges. The larvae feed on various deciduous trees and plants: Betula sp., Alnus incana, Salix sp., Polygonum spp., Chenopodium album, Delphinium sp., Berberis sp., Brassica spp., Rubus idaeus, Sorbus aucuparia, Pisum sativum. Found in very different habitats - forest, meadow, heath and moorland areas as well as in urban gardens and parks. In the mountains, it rises to an altitude of about 1600 meters.

== Notes ==
1. The flight season refers to Belgium and The Netherlands. This may vary in other parts of the range.
