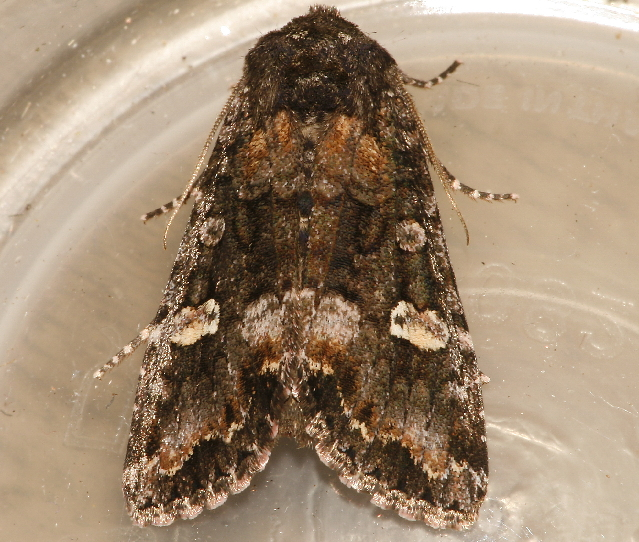

Scientific classification
- Domain: Eukaryota
- Kingdom: Animalia
- Phylum: Arthropoda
- Class: Insecta
- Order: Lepidoptera
- Superfamily: Noctuoidea
- Family: Noctuidae
- Tribe: Hadenini
- Genus: Spiramater; McCabe, 1980

= Spiramater =

Genus of moths

Spiramater is a genus of moths of the family Noctuidae.

== Species ==
- Spiramater lutra (Guenée, 1852)

== Former species ==
- Spiramater grandis is now Lacanobia grandis (Guenée, 1852)
