= Lacanobia mongolica =

Scientific classification
- Domain: Eukaryota
- Kingdom: Animalia
- Phylum: Arthropoda
- Class: Insecta
- Order: Lepidoptera
- Superfamily: Noctuoidea
- Family: Noctuidae
- Genus: Lacanobia
- Species: L. mongolica

Binomial name
- Lacanobia mongolica Behounek, 1992

Species of moth

Lacanobia mongolica is a moth of the Noctuoidea family. It is found in Mongolia, the South Siberian Mountains and the Amur and Primorye regions.

The wingspan is 32–38 mm.
