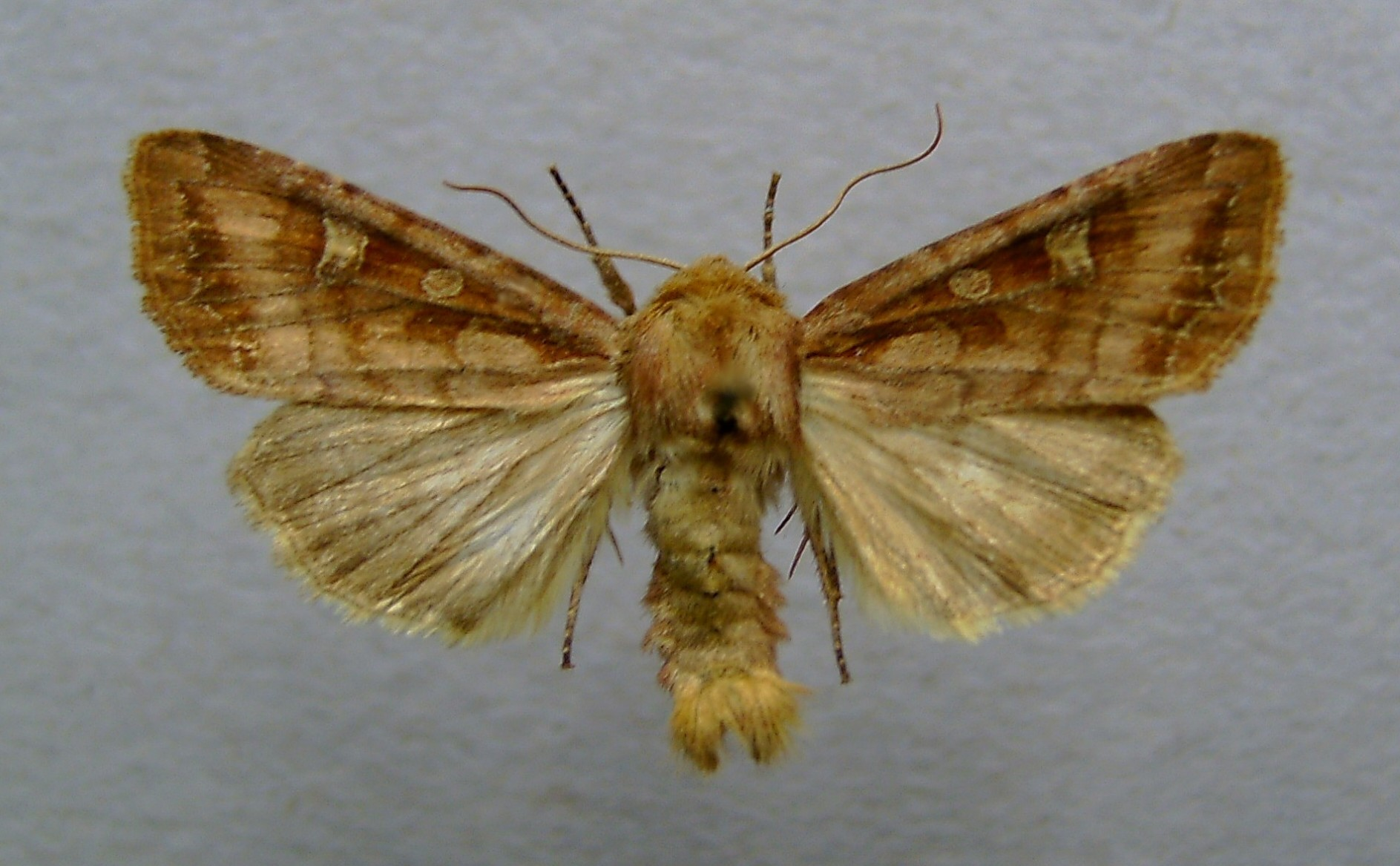

Scientific classification
- Domain: Eukaryota
- Kingdom: Animalia
- Phylum: Arthropoda
- Class: Insecta
- Order: Lepidoptera
- Superfamily: Noctuoidea
- Family: Noctuidae
- Genus: Lacanobia
- Species: L. splendens

Binomial name
- Lacanobia splendens (Hübner, 1808)

Synonyms
- Noctua splendens; Diataraxia splendens; Polia splendens; Mamestra splendens

= Lacanobia splendens =

Species of moth

Lacanobia splendens, the splendid brocade, is a moth of the superfamily Noctuoidea. The species was first described by Jacob Hübner in 1808. It is found in temperate Europe and Asia up to the Pacific coast and Japan.

The wingspan is 32–39 mm. The moth flies from May to July and again in August as a second generation in warm locations.

The larvae feed on various plants, including Cicuta virosa, Menyanthes trifoliata, Solanum dulcamara, Convolvulus, Lactuca (including Lactuca sativa) and Arctium species.
