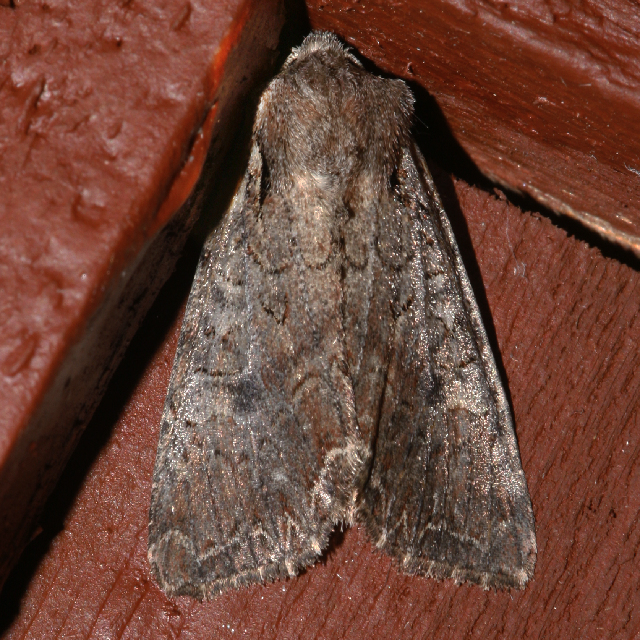

Scientific classification
- Kingdom: Animalia
- Phylum: Arthropoda
- Clade: Pancrustacea
- Class: Insecta
- Order: Lepidoptera
- Superfamily: Noctuoidea
- Family: Noctuidae
- Tribe: Hadenini
- Genus: Lacanobia
- Species: L. radix

Binomial name
- Lacanobia radix (Walker, [1857])

Synonyms
- Lacanobia desperata (Smith, 1891); Mamestra desperata Smith, 1891; Orthosia desperata (Smith, 1891)

= Lacanobia radix =

Species of moth

Lacanobia radix, the garden arches, is a species of cutworm or dart moth in the family Noctuidae. It is found in North America.

The MONA or Hodges number for Lacanobia radix is 10298.
