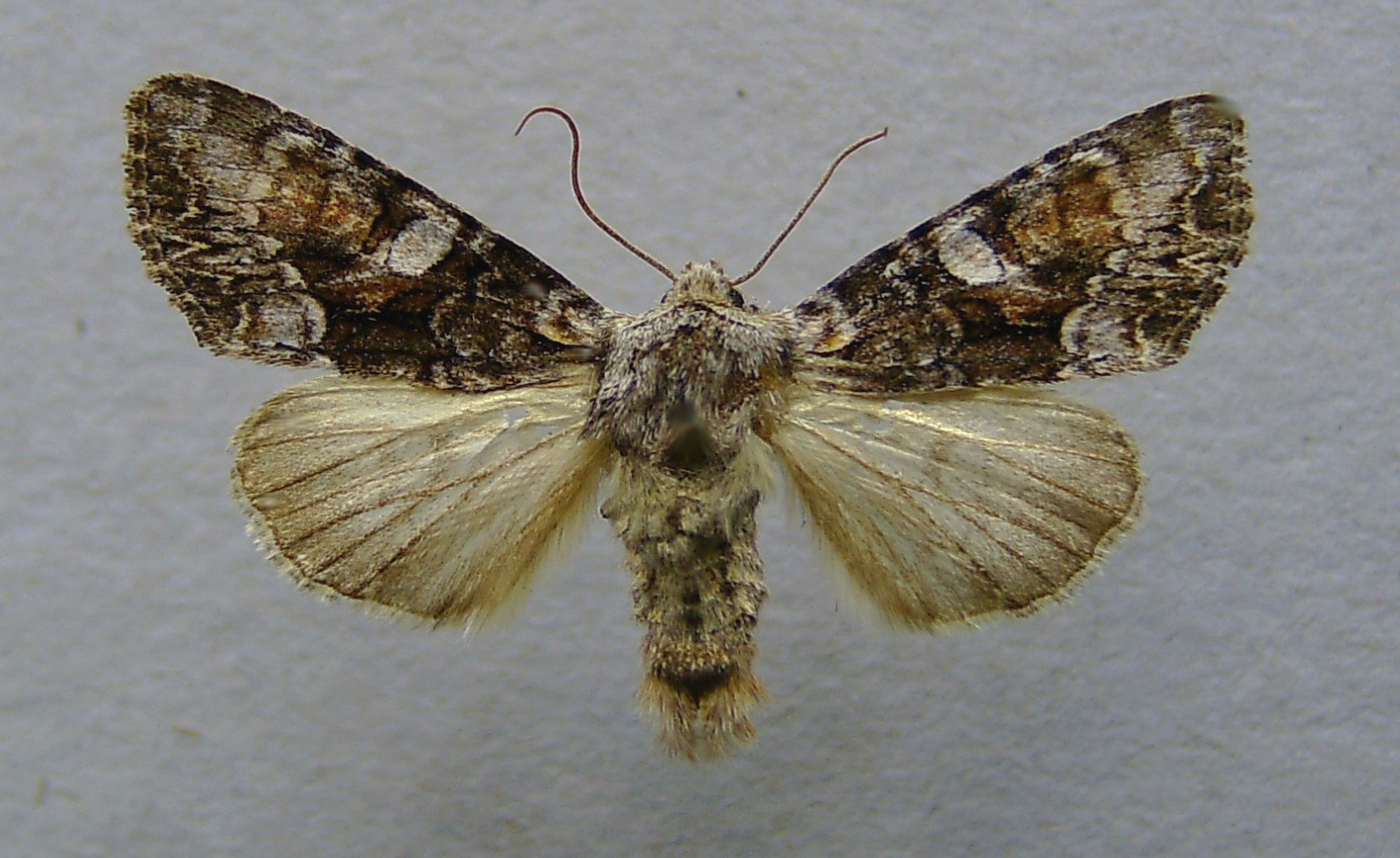

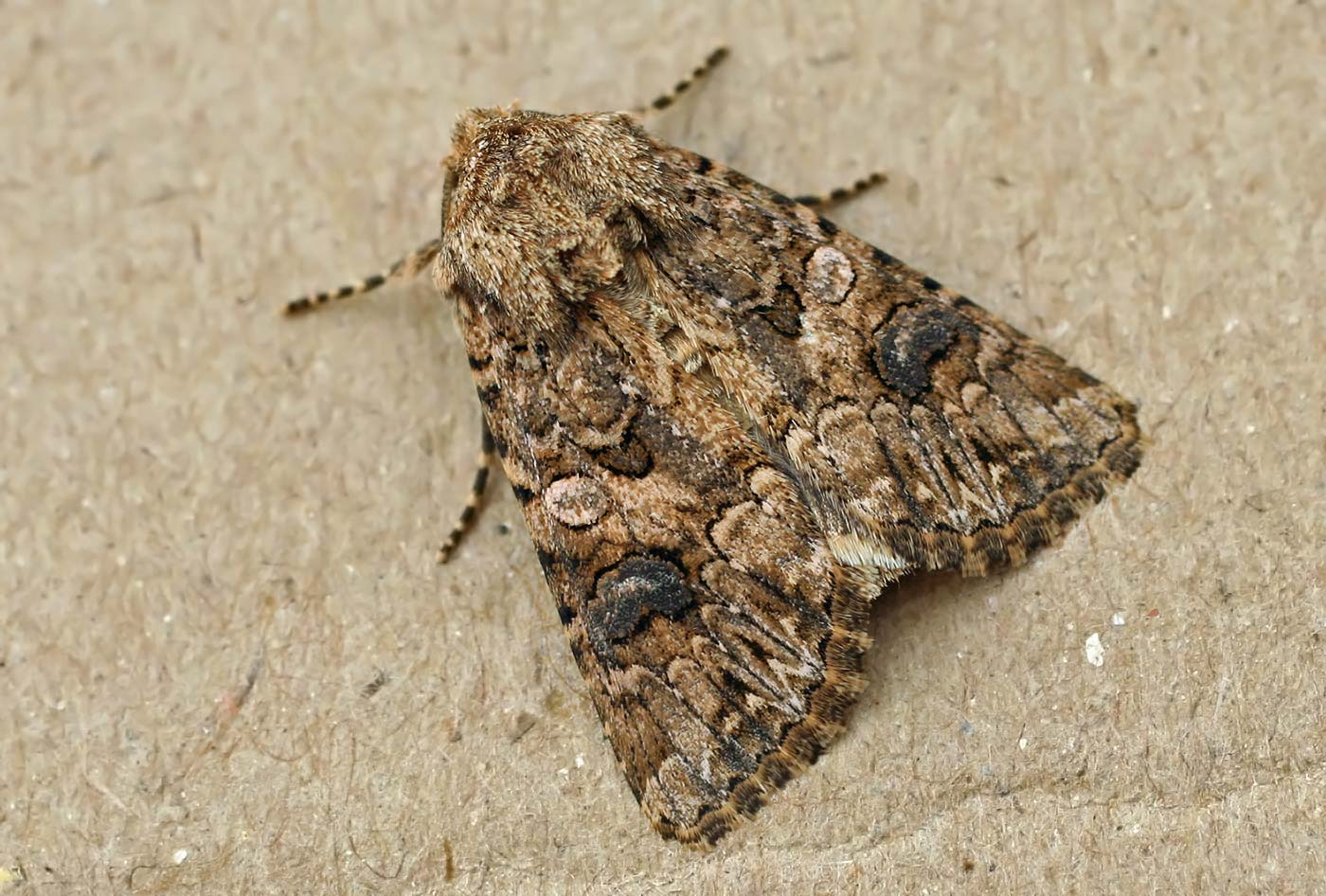

Scientific classification
- Domain: Eukaryota
- Kingdom: Animalia
- Phylum: Arthropoda
- Class: Insecta
- Order: Lepidoptera
- Superfamily: Noctuoidea
- Family: Noctuidae
- Genus: Lacanobia
- Species: L. contigua

Binomial name
- Lacanobia contigua (Denis & Schiffermüller, 1775)

= Lacanobia contigua =

Species of moth

Lacanobia contigua, the beautiful brocade, is a moth of the family Noctuidae. The species was first described by Michael Denis and Ignaz Schiffermüller in 1775. It is found throughout temperate regions of the Palearctic realm, from Ireland east to Siberia and Japan.

== Technical description and variation ==
The wingspan is 36–42 mm. Forewing pale ash grey, suffused with olive brown; a black streak from base below cell, with a pale costal blotch above it; claviform stigma dark, followed by an ochreous white patch at base of vein 2; orbicular stigma whitish, with grey centre, forming with the pale patch beyond claviform and a large pale blotch on inner, margin beyond outer line a kind of oblique pale bar; reniform with lower lobe blackish, followed by a fulvous tinge; submarginal line strongly dentate, the teeth on 3 and 4 reaching margin; hindwing whitish grey, the veins and termen darker. The form subcontigua Ev. is a dark suffused insect, without the pale patches, from the Ural Mts. in Russia, but similar examples occur in other parts; - ab. amurensis Spul. from Amurland is more delicate in the outline of wing, reddish grey, with the markings less distinct.

== Similar species ==
Lacanobia w-latinum is distinguished by the following characteristics: wingspan usually larger (36 to 41 millimeters);postdiscal region broadly grey, ring blemishes usually filled with grey-brown; yellow-white oblique blotch to the inner angle is missing; W signs in the wavy line stronger and arrow spots weaker;hind wings slightly darker in colour.

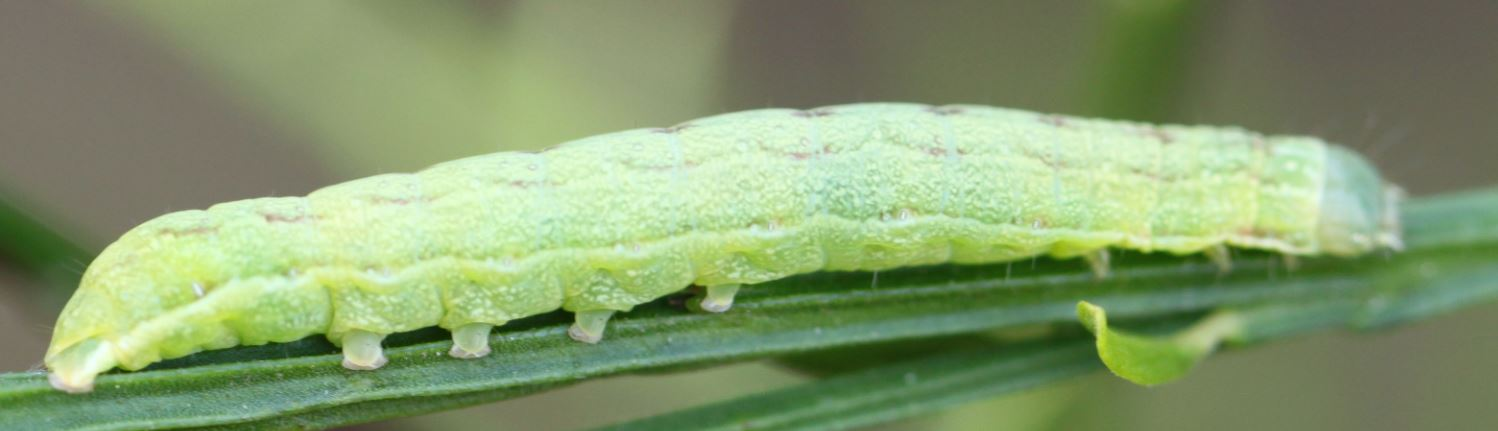
Larva

== Biology ==
The moth flies from May to July depending on the location.

Larva dull yellowish green, mottled with orange and reddish brown; dorsum with a row of dark V-shaped markings; spiracular line reddish brown. The larva mainly feed on a wide variety of various trees, bushes and herbaceous plants: Betulaceae, Umbelliferae, Ranunculaceae, Cruciferae, Salicaceae, Dennstaedtiaceae, Crassulaceae, Urticaceae, Ericaceae, etc.
