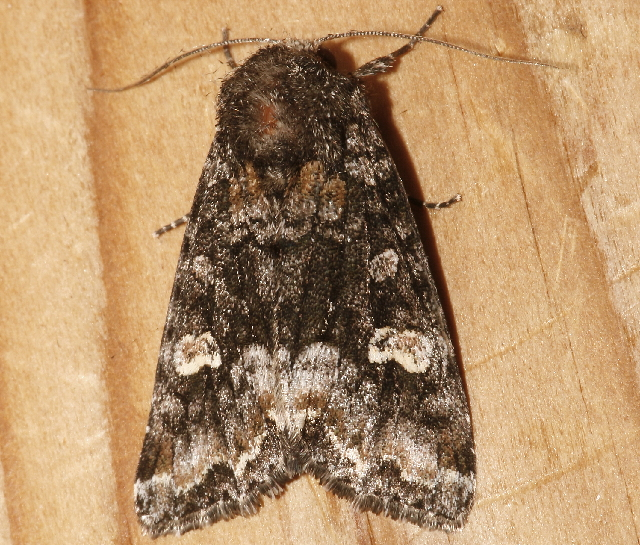

Scientific classification
- Kingdom: Animalia
- Phylum: Arthropoda
- Class: Insecta
- Order: Lepidoptera
- Superfamily: Noctuoidea
- Family: Noctuidae
- Genus: Spiramater
- Species: S. lutra

Binomial name
- Spiramater lutra (Guenée, 1852)

= Spiramater lutra =

Species of moth

Spiramater lutra, the otter spiramater, is a species of cutworm or dart moth in the family Noctuidae. It is found in North America.

The MONA or Hodges number for Spiramater lutra is 10301.
