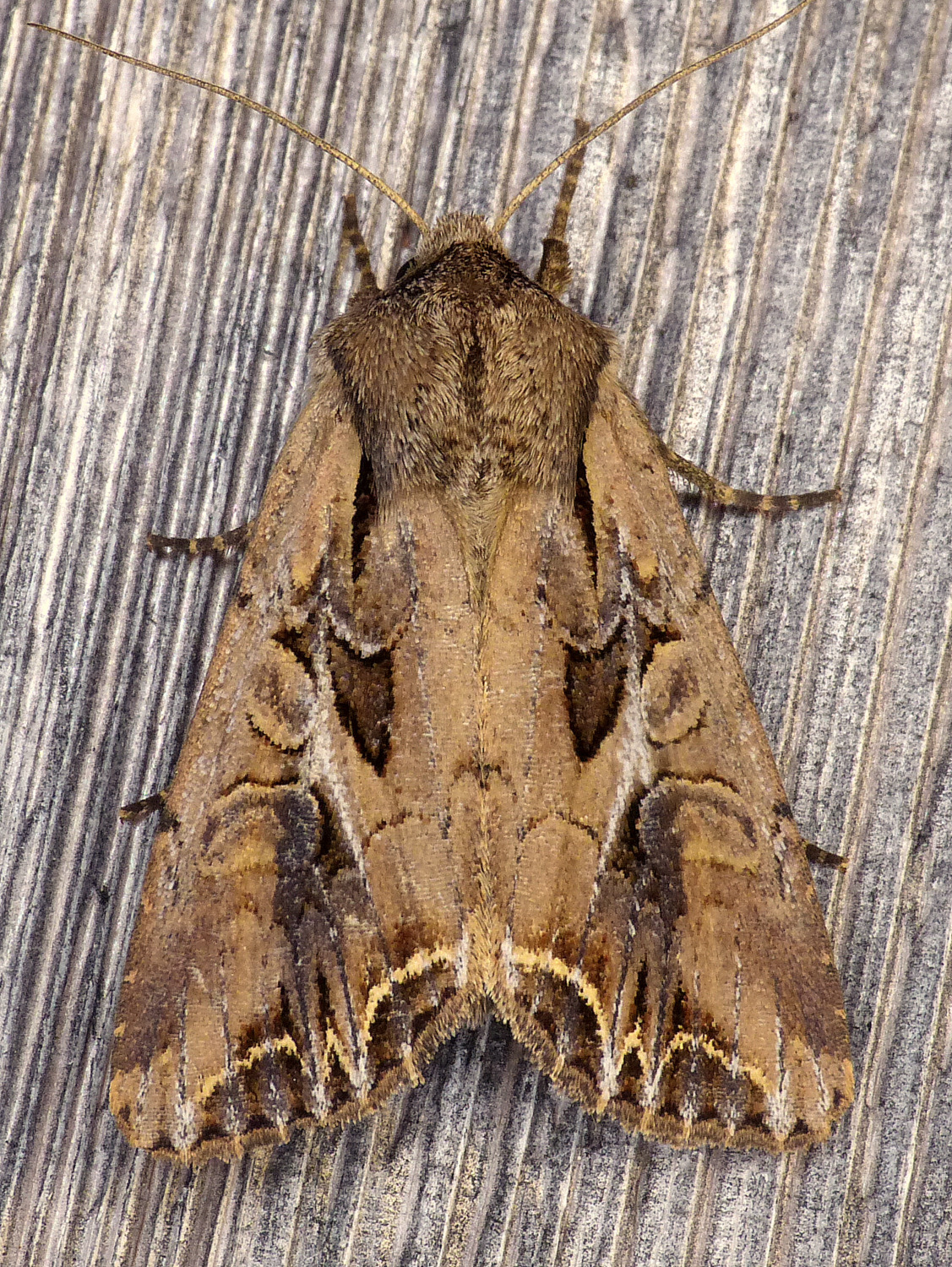

Scientific classification
- Kingdom: Animalia
- Phylum: Arthropoda
- Class: Insecta
- Order: Lepidoptera
- Superfamily: Noctuoidea
- Family: Noctuidae
- Genus: Lacanobia
- Species: L. atlantica

Binomial name
- Lacanobia atlantica (Grote, 1874)

= Lacanobia atlantica =

Species of moth

Lacanobia atlantica, the Atlantic arches moth, is a species of cutworm or dart moth in the family Noctuidae. It is found in North America.

The MONA or Hodges number for Lacanobia atlantica is 10297.
