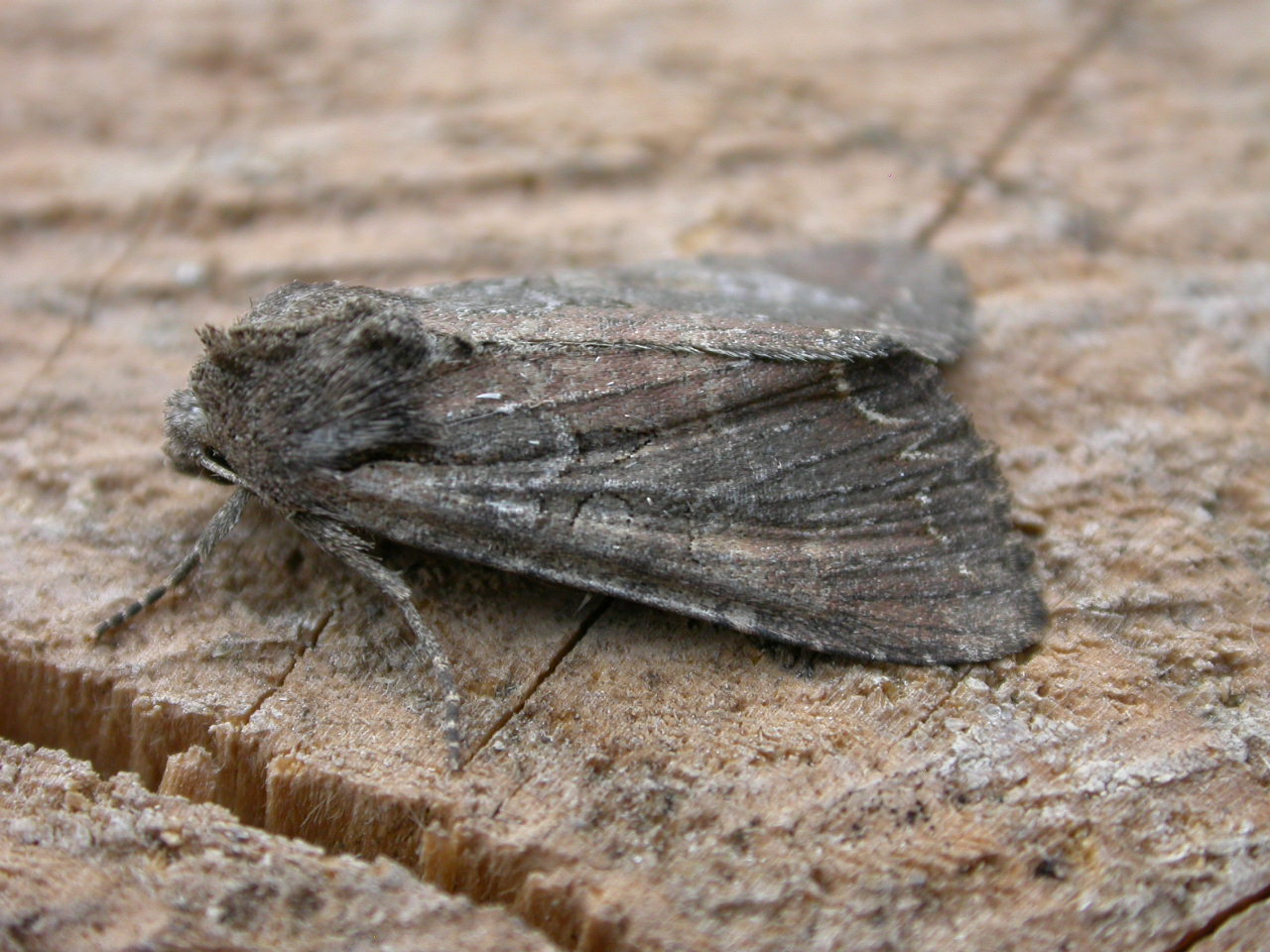

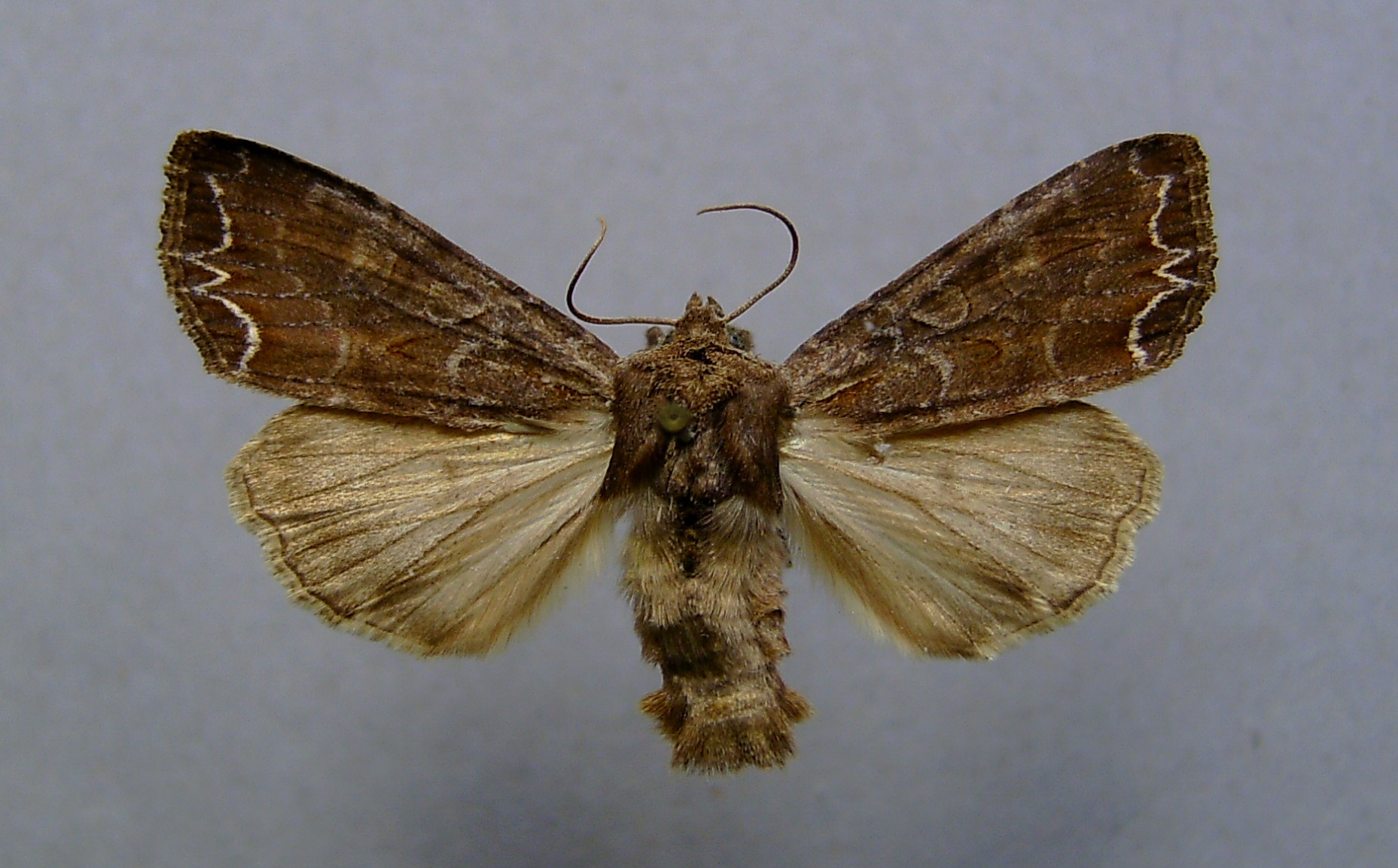

Scientific classification
- Domain: Eukaryota
- Kingdom: Animalia
- Phylum: Arthropoda
- Class: Insecta
- Order: Lepidoptera
- Superfamily: Noctuoidea
- Family: Noctuidae
- Genus: Lacanobia
- Species: L. suasa

Binomial name
- Lacanobia suasa (Denis & Schiffermüller, 1775)

= Lacanobia suasa =

Species of moth

Lacanobia suasa, the dog’s tooth, is a moth of the family Noctuidae. It is found in the Palearctic realm (Europe, Ural Mountains, Russia, Amur Oblast).

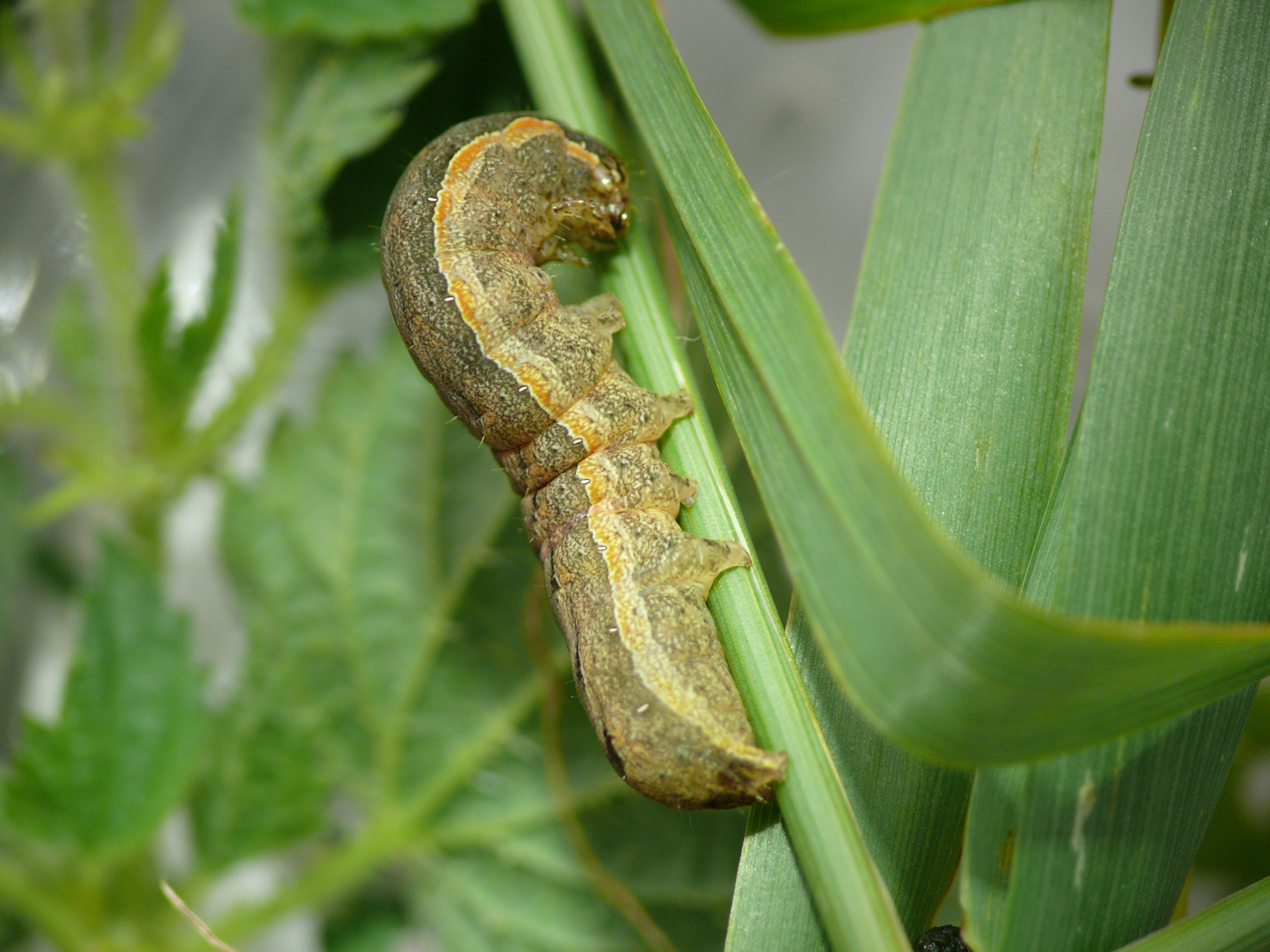
Larva

== Technical description and variation ==
The wingspan is 32–37 mm. Forewing pale ash grey, suffused with olive brown; a black streak from base below cell, Forewing uniform dull red brown, with all the markings obscured, even the black basal streak sometimes obsolete, as well as the usually plain pale submarginal line with its two sharp teeth on veins 3 and 4; hindwing dull fuscous, paler towards base with the veins darker; the form suasa Bkh. [sic] the commonest of all, is pale leatherbrown, with distinct markings, a black basal streak, blackish claviform stigma, a dark cloud at lower end of cell, and black marginal area; the upper stigmata paler; of this laeta Reuter from Scandinavia, Finland, and the Baltic coast, but occurring also elsewhere, is an extreme form, showing a pale patch at base of costa and black wedgeshaped marks preceding the pale submarginal line; confluens Ev. is the darkest form of all, being entirely blackish fuscous, with the markings just outlined and the submarginal line sometimes broken up into dots; a pale greyish-red form from Turania, ab. turanica Spul, has the markings more or less obsolete, but the submarginal line distinct; finally extincta Stgr. from Amurland is also a dark form with the pale markings yellow instead of white.

== Similar species ==
Lacanobia thalassina some forms

== Biology ==
The moth flies from April to October depending on the location.

Larva reddish yellow, dotted with white and dark grey; dorsal and subdorsal lines grey, the last obscured by dark streaks; lateral lines yellow with blackish edges. The larvae feed on various herbaceous plants. These include Betula spp., Alnus incana, Corylus avellana, Salix spp., Polygonum spp., Rumex spp., Chenopodium album, Atriplex sp., Brassica sp., Brassica campestris, Rubus idaeus, Malus domestica, Trifolium sp., Galium sp., Cirsium arvense. .
