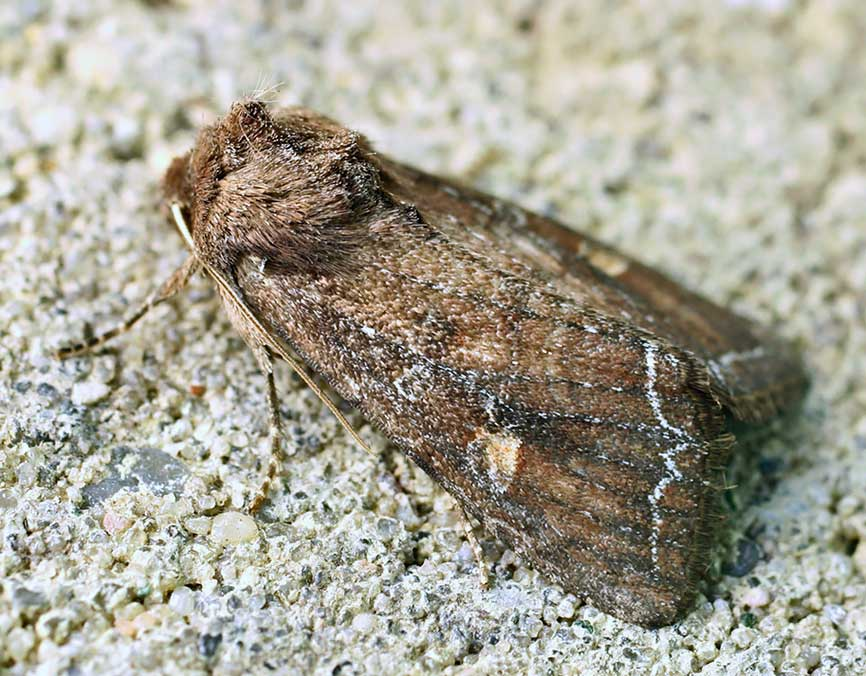
- Lacanobia oleracea

Scientific classification
- Domain: Eukaryota
- Kingdom: Animalia
- Phylum: Arthropoda
- Class: Insecta
- Order: Lepidoptera
- Superfamily: Noctuoidea
- Family: Noctuidae
- Subfamily: Noctuinae
- Tribe: Hadenini
- Genus: Lacanobia; Billberg, 1820

= Lacanobia =

Genus of insects

Lacanobia is a genus of moths in the family Noctuidae.

== Species ==
- Lacanobia aliena (Hübner, [1809])
- Lacanobia altyntaghi Gyulai & Ronkay, 1998
- Lacanobia atlantica (Grote, 1874)
- Lacanobia behouneki Hreblay & Plante, 1996
- Lacanobia blenna (Hübner, [1824])
- Lacanobia contigua – Beautiful brocade (Denis & Schiffermüller, 1775)
- Lacanobia contrastata (Bryk, 1942)
- Lacanobia dentata (Kononenko, 1981)
- Lacanobia grandis (Guenée, 1852)
- Lacanobia kirghisa Gyulai & Ronkay, 1998
- Lacanobia mista (Staudinger, 1889)
- Lacanobia mongolica Behounek, 1992
- Lacanobia nevadae (Grote, 1876)
- Lacanobia oleracea – Bright-line brown-eye (Linnaeus, 1758)
- Lacanobia praedita (Hübner, [1813])
- Lacanobia radix (Walker, [1857]) (=Lacanobia desperata (Smith, 1891))
- Lacanobia softa (Staudinger, 1897)
- Lacanobia splendens (Hübner, [1808])
- Lacanobia suasa – Dog's tooth (Denis & Schiffermüller, 1775)
- Lacanobia subjuncta (Grote & Robinson, 1868)
- Lacanobia thalassina – Pale-shouldered brocade (Hufnagel, 1766)
- Lacanobia w-latinoides Gyulai & Ronkay, 1998
- Lacanobia w-latinum – Light brocade (Hufnagel, 1766)
