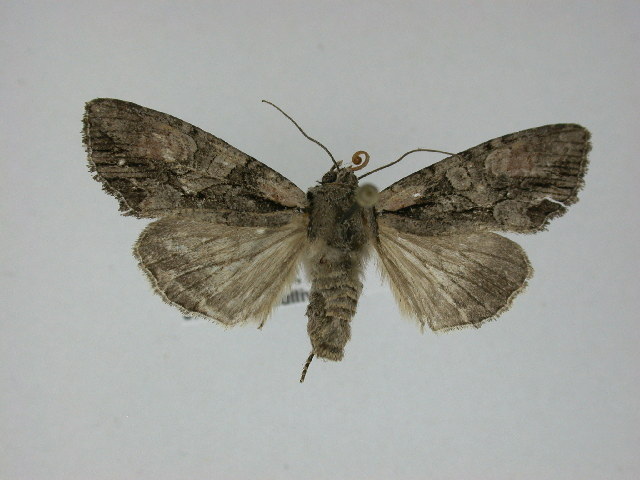

Scientific classification
- Kingdom: Animalia
- Phylum: Arthropoda
- Class: Insecta
- Order: Lepidoptera
- Superfamily: Noctuoidea
- Family: Noctuidae
- Tribe: Hadenini
- Genus: Lacanobia
- Species: L. subjuncta

Binomial name
- Lacanobia subjuncta (Grote & Robinson, 1868)

= Lacanobia subjuncta =

Species of moth

Lacanobia subjuncta, the speckled cutworm, is a species of cutworm or dart moth in the family Noctuidae. It is found in North America.

The MONA or Hodges number for Lacanobia subjuncta is 10299.
