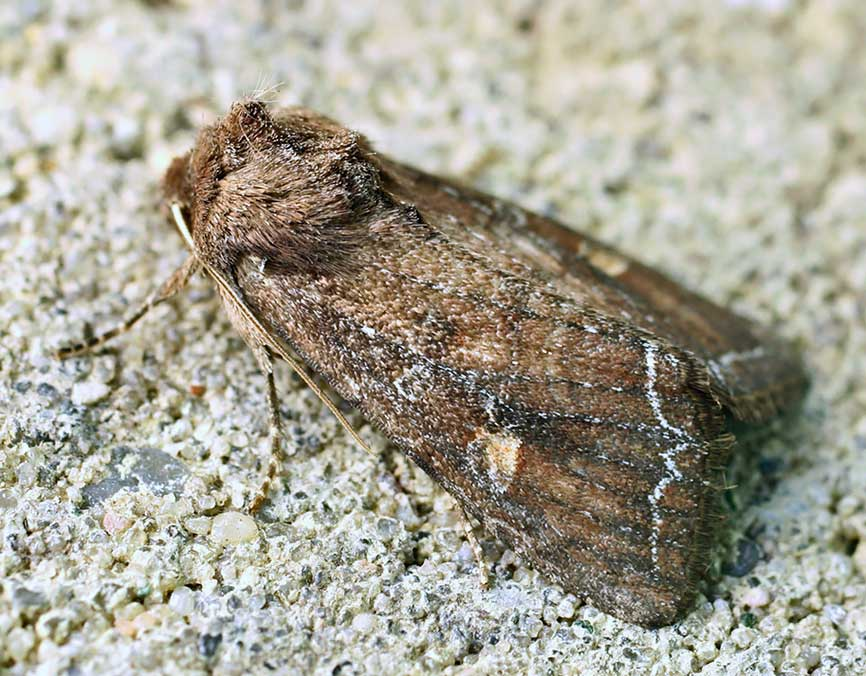

Scientific classification
- Kingdom: Animalia
- Phylum: Arthropoda
- Class: Insecta
- Order: Lepidoptera
- Superfamily: Noctuoidea
- Family: Noctuidae
- Genus: Lacanobia
- Species: L. oleracea

Binomial name
- Lacanobia oleracea (Linnaeus, 1758)

= Bright-line brown-eye =

Species of moth

The bright-line brown-eye (Lacanobia oleracea) is a moth of the family Noctuidae. The species was first described by Carl Linnaeus in his 1758 10th edition of Systema Naturae. It is a common species throughout Europe, but is also found in North Africa (Morocco and Algeria), temperate North Asia and Central Asia, Asia Minor, Syria, and Turkestan, northern India, China, Korea and Japan.

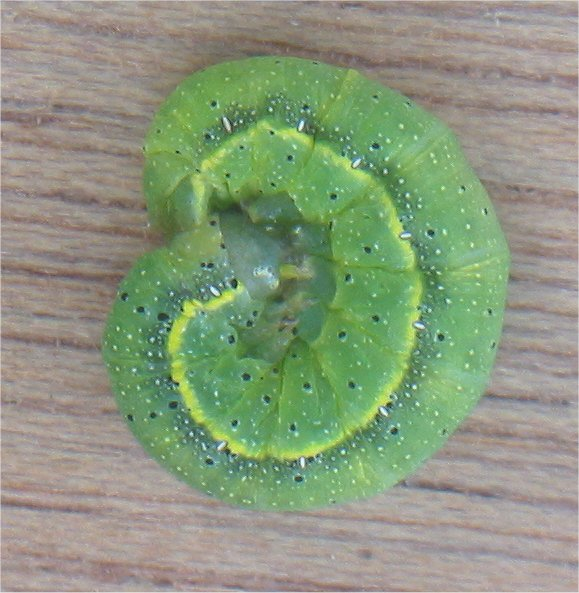
Larva

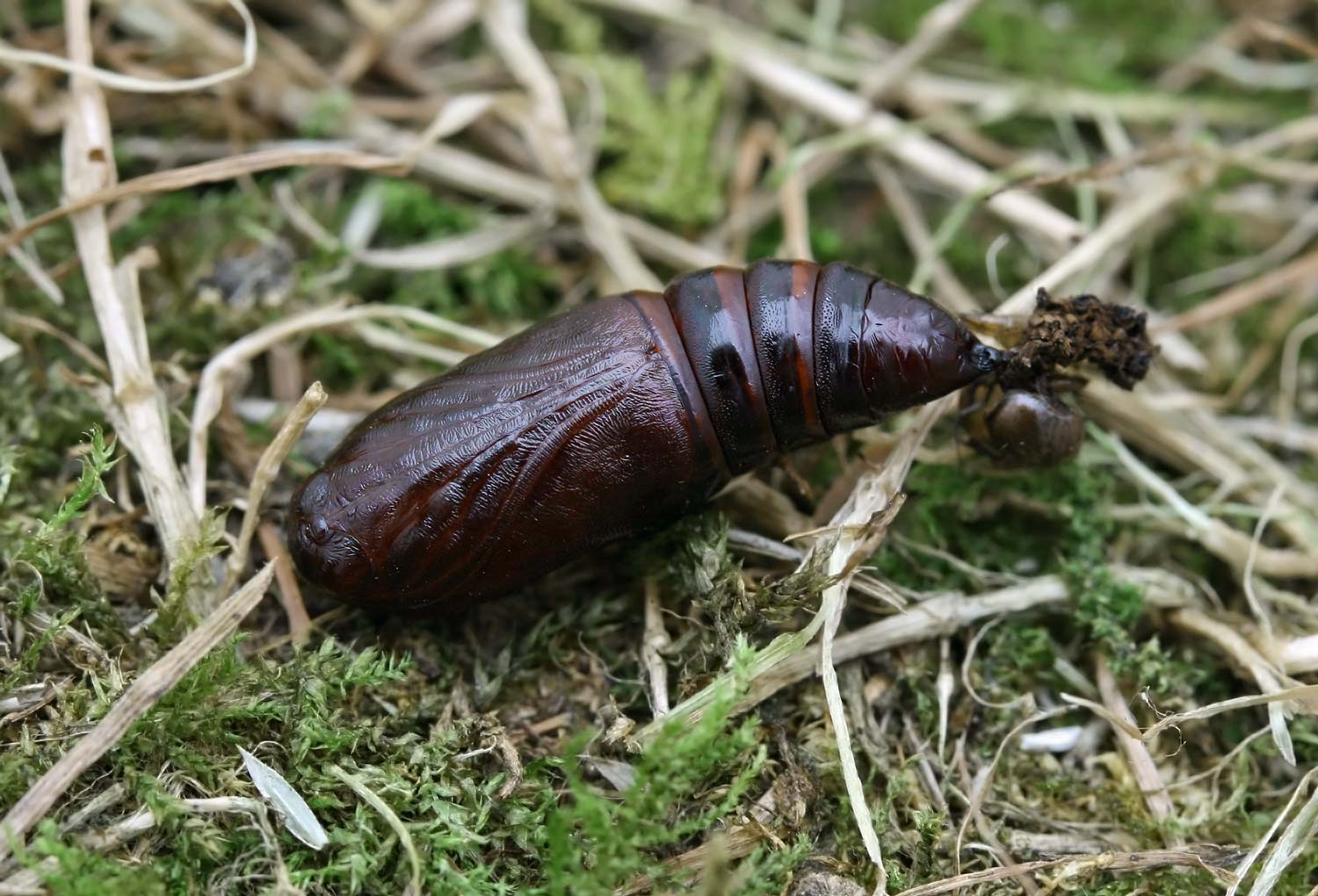
Pupa

This species' common name is usefully descriptive: The forewings are dark reddish brown marked with a prominent light orange-brown stigma and a bright white subterminal line. The hindwings are grey, darker towards the termen. The wingspan is 34–44 mm. They are attracted to light, sugar and nectar-rich flowers.

== Technical description and variation ==
[Wingspan 35 to 40 mm.] Forewing red brown clouded with darker; veins grey, whitish towards termen: reniform stigma orange in its upper part, dark fuscous below; orbicular round, white edged, sometimes very small; submarginal line finely white, toothed on veins 3 and 4 to termen; hindwing dull whitish, pale fuscous towards termen; the veins dark. The ground colour varies on one side to black brown, ab. obscura Spul, and on the other to rufous, ab. rufa Tutt; ab. variegata Aust, from Morocco, is paler, reddish yellow.

The larva is green or brown dotted with white with black and yellow spiracular lines down the side with darker edging. The tubercles are black. It feeds on a wide range of plants and is occasionally a pest of cultivated tomatoes. The species overwinters as a pupa.

It is on wing from the latter half of June to July. Occasionally, there will be a second generation from the end of August to the first half of September.

It mainly colonises cultivated land such as gardens, park landscapes and fallow land where suitable forage plants grow. In addition, it can also be found in swamp forests, valley floors and floodplains.
