= Lacanobia softa =

Scientific classification
- Domain: Eukaryota
- Kingdom: Animalia
- Phylum: Arthropoda
- Class: Insecta
- Order: Lepidoptera
- Superfamily: Noctuoidea
- Family: Noctuidae
- Genus: Lacanobia
- Species: L. softa

Binomial name
- Lacanobia softa (Staudinger, 1898)

Synonyms
- Mamestra softa Staudinger, 1897; Miselia softa luteocinnamomea Rothschild, 1920

Species of moth

Lacanobia softa is a species of moth of the family Noctuidae. It is found in Algeria, Morocco, Israel and Jordan.

Adults are on wing from October through winter to May. There are two generations per year.
