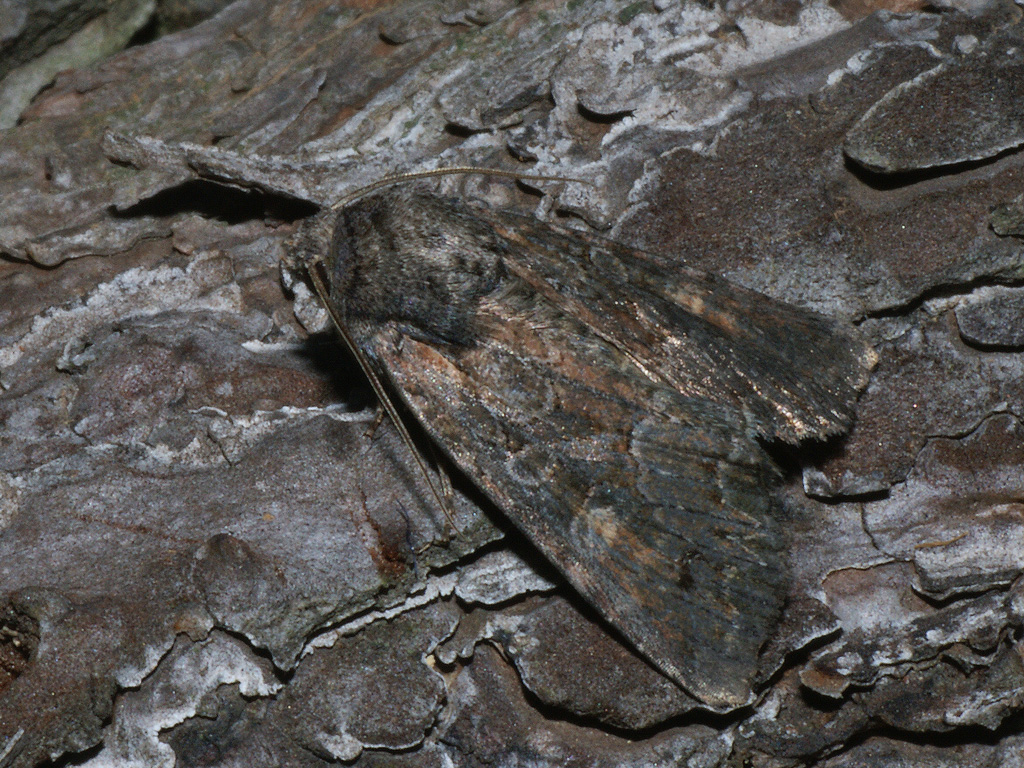
- Lacanobia aliena

Scientific classification
- Kingdom: Animalia
- Phylum: Arthropoda
- Clade: Pancrustacea
- Class: Insecta
- Order: Lepidoptera
- Superfamily: Noctuoidea
- Family: Noctuidae
- Genus: Lacanobia
- Species: L. aliena

Binomial name
- Lacanobia aliena (Hübner, 1808/1809)

= Lacanobia aliena =

Species of moth

Lacanobia aliena is a species of moth belonging to the family Noctuidae.

Synonyms:

- Noctua aliena Hübner, 1809 (= basionym)
- Mamestra amurensis Staudinger, 1901
