= Lacanobia nevadae =

Scientific classification
- Kingdom: Animalia
- Phylum: Arthropoda
- Clade: Pancrustacea
- Class: Insecta
- Order: Lepidoptera
- Superfamily: Noctuoidea
- Family: Noctuidae
- Genus: Lacanobia
- Species: L. nevadae

Binomial name
- Lacanobia nevadae (Grote, 1876)

Synonyms
- Polia nevadae canadensis (Smith, 1887)

Species of moth

Lacanobia nevadae, the Nevada arches moth, is a species of cutworm or dart moth in the family Noctuidae. It is found in North America.

The MONA or Hodges number for Lacanobia nevadae is 10296.
