= Lacanobia kirghisa =

Scientific classification
- Domain: Eukaryota
- Kingdom: Animalia
- Phylum: Arthropoda
- Class: Insecta
- Order: Lepidoptera
- Superfamily: Noctuoidea
- Family: Noctuidae
- Genus: Lacanobia
- Species: L. kirghisa

Binomial name
- Lacanobia kirghisa Gyulai & Ronkay, 1998

Species of moth

Lacanobia kirghisa is a moth of the Noctuoidea family. It is found in Kyrgyzstan.
