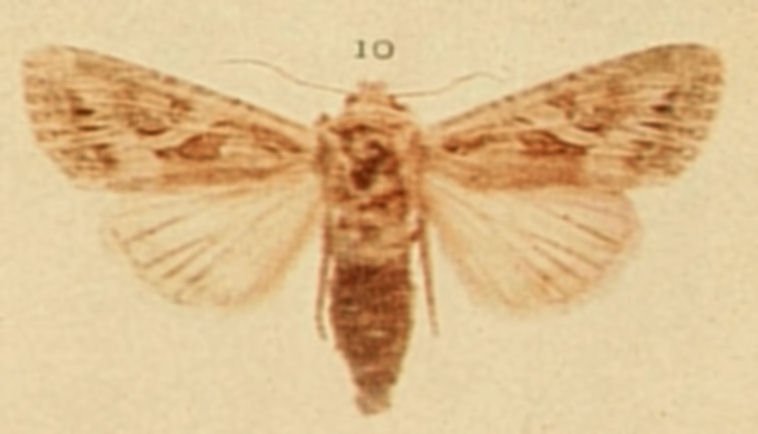

Scientific classification
- Domain: Eukaryota
- Kingdom: Animalia
- Phylum: Arthropoda
- Class: Insecta
- Order: Lepidoptera
- Superfamily: Noctuoidea
- Family: Noctuidae
- Genus: Lacanobia
- Species: L. blenna

Binomial name
- Lacanobia blenna (Hübner, 1824)

Synonyms
- Noctua blenna Hübner, 1824; Hadena peregrina Treitschke, 1825; Noctua salsolae Rambur, 1829; Noctua trimenda Geyer, 1833

= Lacanobia blenna =

Species of moth

Lacanobia blenna, the stranger, is a moth of the family Noctuidae. The species was first described by Jacob Hübner in 1824. It is found in southern Europe, east to Turkmenistan.

== Technical description and variation ==
The wingspan is 36–44 mm. Forewing greyish ochreous, the median area tinged with brownish or fuscous; claviform stigma indistinct, black-edged, followed by a pale patch at base of vein 2; orbicular and reniform pale, partly black-edged, the lower lobe of the latter dark; submarginal line pale, with brown on each side of it, dentate to margin along veins 3 and 4; costa and apex pale; hindwing dull whitish, browner towards termen; the veins dark. Larva yellow, dotted with brown, especially on dorsal areathe brown dots ringed with pale, forming dorsal and subdorsal lines; lateral and spiracular lines yellow.

== Biology ==
The moth flies from May to August depending on the location.

The larvae feed on sea beet and Salsola kali.
