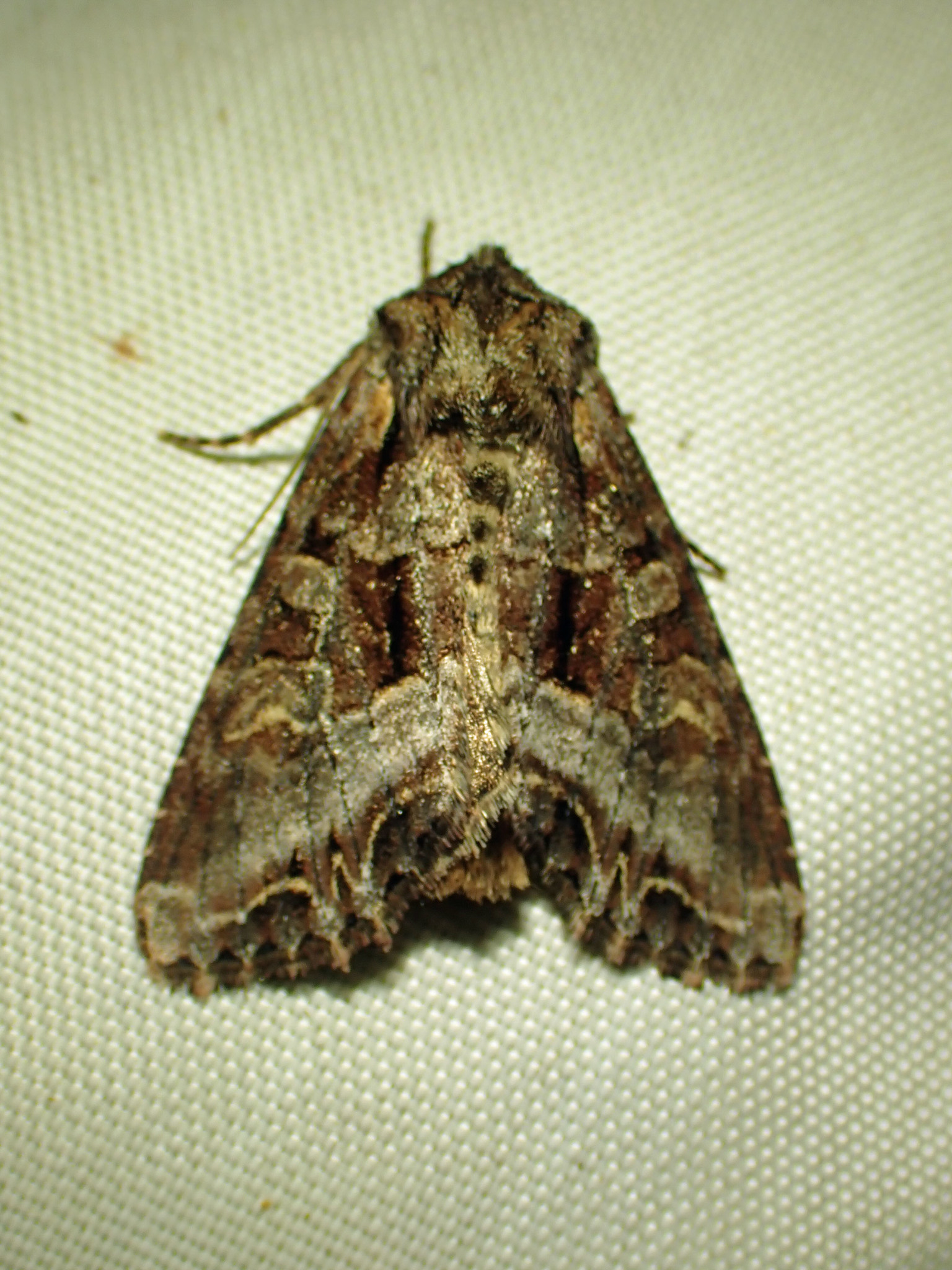

Scientific classification
- Kingdom: Animalia
- Phylum: Arthropoda
- Class: Insecta
- Order: Lepidoptera
- Superfamily: Noctuoidea
- Family: Noctuidae
- Genus: Lacanobia
- Species: L. grandis

Binomial name
- Lacanobia grandis (Guenée, 1852)

= Lacanobia grandis =

Species of moth

Lacanobia grandis, commonly known as the grand arches moth, is a species of cutworm or dart moth in the family Noctuidae.
