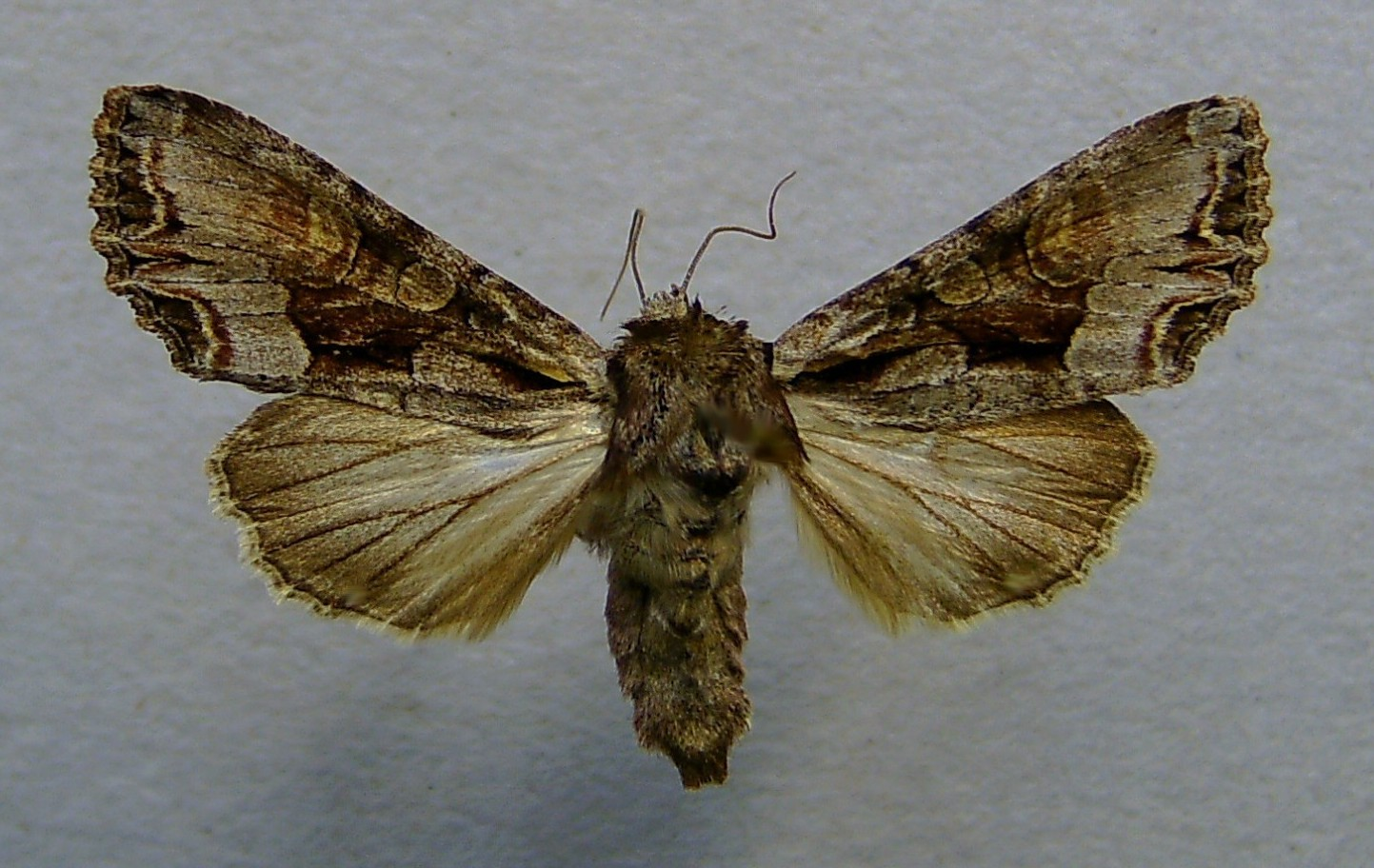

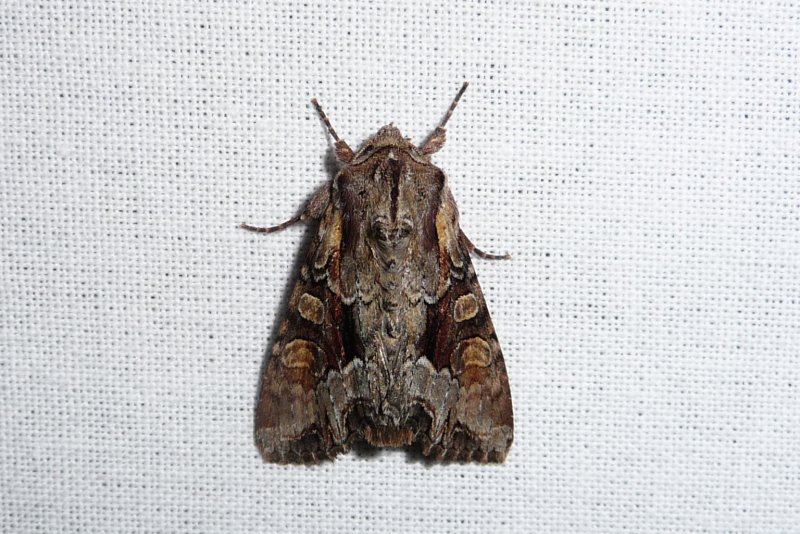

Scientific classification
- Domain: Eukaryota
- Kingdom: Animalia
- Phylum: Arthropoda
- Class: Insecta
- Order: Lepidoptera
- Superfamily: Noctuoidea
- Family: Noctuidae
- Genus: Lacanobia
- Species: L. w-latinum

Binomial name
- Lacanobia w-latinum (Hufnagel, 1766)

Synonyms
- Phalaena w-latinum Hufnagel, 1766; Phalaena (Noctua) genistae Borkhausen, 1792; Phalaena dives Donovan, 1801; Phalaena rectilinea (Haworth, 1809); Phalaena mista (Staudinger, 1889); Mamestra genistae diniensis Heinrich, 1938; Polia w-latinum divitis Bryk, 1942; Mamestra genistae caerulescens Schwingenschuss, 1962

= Lacanobia w-latinum =

Species of moth

Lacanobia w-latinum, the light brocade, is a moth of the family Noctuidae. The species was first described by Johann Siegfried Hufnagel in 1766. It is found in Europe, east to Turkmenistan and Anatolia.

== Description ==
The wingspan is 36–41 mm. The species is very similar to Lacanobia contigua. The forewing ground colour is red brown, violet brown, silver grey and dark brown. The reniform and orbicular stains are large and partially reddish tinted. The basal dash is very dark and striking. The midfield and extreme marginal area also stand out also dark, while the inner marginal field is grey brown to silver grey. In the subterminal light wavy line, a large W character is visible, which serves as the basis for the Latin name w-latinum. The hindwings are grey brown and mostly without markings but slightly darkened at the edge, only the dark veins emerge more clearly. The flat, hemispherical egg has protruding, wavy ribs. It is initially yellowish green, later whitish or grey with crimson spots on the top. The colouration of the caterpillars varies from greenish or yellowish to brownish grey. They have an indistinct dark dorsal line with dark slashes. In addition, they show bright lateral stripes and legs, as well as black spiracles. The head has two distinctive vertical, black stripes. The dark red-brown pupa has a small, shovel-shaped cremaster with two tips constricted at the base.

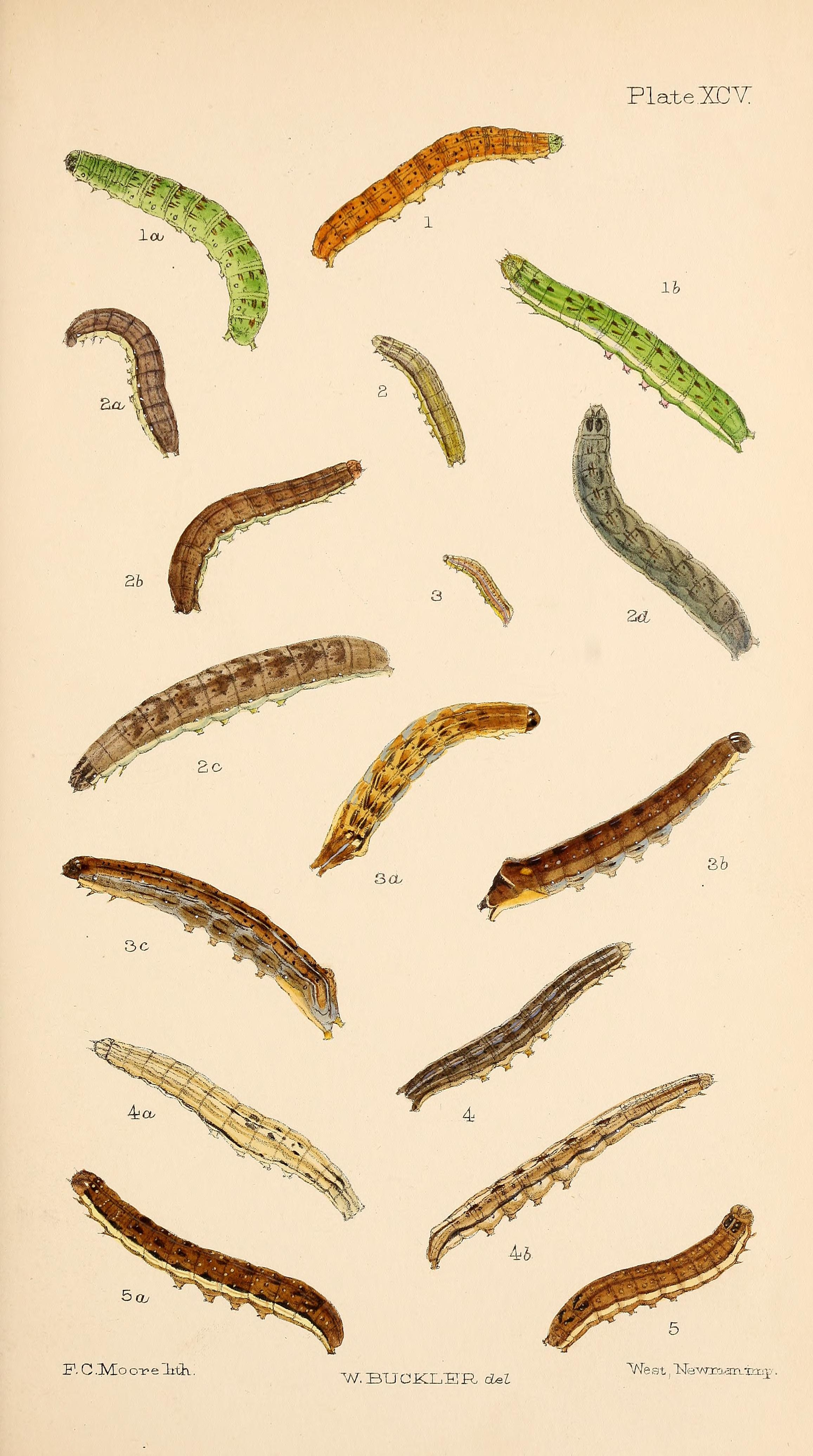
2, 2a, 2b, 2c, 2 d larvae in various stages

== Similar species ==
- Lacanobia contigua some forms

== Biology ==
The moth flies from June to July depending on the location.

The larvae feed on various plants, including Vaccinium species (including Vaccinium myrtillus), Genista, Sarothamnus scoparius, Coronilla coronata, Prunus, Senecio, Calluna, Betula and Quercus.

Main habitat are warm slopes, mixed forests, bushy heaths and park-like landscapes. In the mountains, it rises to a height of about 1600 meters.
