= List of moths of Metropolitan France (D–H) =

Partial list of moths in Metropolitan France

This is a list of moths of families starting from D to H that are found in Metropolitan France (including Corsica). It also acts as an index to the species articles and forms part of the full List of Lepidoptera of Metropolitan France.

== Family Douglasiidae ==
- Klimeschia transversella (Zeller, 1839)
- Tinagma balteolella (Fischer von Röslerstamm, 1841)
- Tinagma dryadis Staudinger, 1872
- Tinagma ocnerostomella (Stainton, 1850)
- Tinagma perdicella Zeller, 1839

== Family Drepanidae ==
- Achlya flavicornis (Linnaeus, 1758)
- Asphalia ruficollis (Denis & Schiffermüller, 1775)
- Cilix glaucata (Scopoli, 1763)
- Cymatophorina diluta (Denis & Schiffermüller, 1775)
- Drepana curvatula (Borkhausen, 1790)
- Drepana falcataria (Linnaeus, 1758)
- Falcaria lacertinaria (Linnaeus, 1758)
- Habrosyne pyritoides (Hufnagel, 1766)
- Ochropacha duplaris (Linnaeus, 1761)
- Polyploca ridens (Fabricius, 1787)
- Sabra harpagula (Esper, 1786)
- Tethea ocularis (Linnaeus, 1767)
- Tethea or (Denis & Schiffermüller, 1775)
- Tetheella fluctuosa (Hübner, 1803)
- Thyatira batis (Linnaeus, 1758)
- Watsonalla binaria (Hufnagel, 1767)
- Watsonalla cultraria (Fabricius, 1775)
- Watsonalla uncinula (Borkhausen, 1790)

== Family Elachistidae ==
- Agonopterix adspersella (Kollar, 1832)
- Agonopterix alpigena (Frey, 1870)
- Agonopterix alstromeriana (Clerck, 1759)
- Agonopterix angelicella (Hübner, 1813)
- Agonopterix arenella (Denis & Schiffermüller, 1775)
- Agonopterix aspersella (Constant, 1888)
- Agonopterix assimilella (Treitschke, 1832)
- Agonopterix astrantiae (Heinemann, 1870)
- Agonopterix atomella (Denis & Schiffermüller, 1775)
- Agonopterix bipunctosa (Curtis, 1850)
- Agonopterix cadurciella (Chretien, 1914)
- Agonopterix capreolella (Zeller, 1839)
- Agonopterix carduella (Hübner, 1817)
- Agonopterix cervariella (Constant, 1884)
- Agonopterix chironiella (Constant, 1893)
- Agonopterix ciliella (Stainton, 1849)
- Agonopterix cnicella (Treitschke, 1832)
- Agonopterix conterminella (Zeller, 1839)
- Agonopterix curvipunctosa (Haworth, 1811)
- Agonopterix cyrniella (Rebel, 1929)
- Agonopterix doronicella (Wocke, 1849)
- Agonopterix ferocella (Chretien, 1910)
- Agonopterix ferulae (Zeller, 1847)
- Agonopterix fruticosella (Walsingham, 1903)
- Agonopterix furvella (Treitschke, 1832)
- Agonopterix heracliana (Linnaeus, 1758)
- Agonopterix hippomarathri (Nickerl, 1864)
- Agonopterix irrorata (Staudinger, 1870)
- Agonopterix kaekeritziana (Linnaeus, 1767)
- Agonopterix laterella (Denis & Schiffermüller, 1775)
- Agonopterix ligusticella (Chretien, 1908)
- Agonopterix liturosa (Haworth, 1811)
- Agonopterix nanatella (Stainton, 1849)
- Agonopterix nervosa (Haworth, 1811)
- Agonopterix nodiflorella (Milliere, 1866)
- Agonopterix ocellana (Fabricius, 1775)
- Agonopterix oinochroa (Turati, 1879)
- Agonopterix pallorella (Zeller, 1839)
- Agonopterix parilella (Treitschke, 1835)
- Agonopterix perstrigella (Chretien, 1925)
- Agonopterix petasitis (Standfuss, 1851)
- Agonopterix propinquella (Treitschke, 1835)
- Agonopterix purpurea (Haworth, 1811)
- Agonopterix putridella (Denis & Schiffermüller, 1775)
- Agonopterix rotundella (Douglas, 1846)
- Agonopterix rutana (Fabricius, 1794)
- Agonopterix scopariella (Heinemann, 1870)
- Agonopterix selini (Heinemann, 1870)
- Agonopterix senecionis (Nickerl, 1864)
- Agonopterix seraphimella (Lhomme, 1929)
- Agonopterix squamosa (Mann, 1864)
- Agonopterix straminella (Staudinger, 1859)
- Agonopterix subpropinquella (Stainton, 1849)
- Agonopterix thapsiella (Zeller, 1847)
- Agonopterix umbellana (Fabricius, 1794)
- Agonopterix vendettella (Chretien, 1908)
- Agonopterix yeatiana (Fabricius, 1781)
- Anchinia cristalis (Scopoli, 1763)
- Anchinia daphnella (Denis & Schiffermüller, 1775)
- Anchinia grisescens Frey, 1856
- Anchinia laureolella Herrich-Schäffer, 1854
- Blastodacna atra (Haworth, 1828)
- Blastodacna hellerella (Duponchel, 1838)
- Blastodacna vinolentella (Herrich-Schäffer, 1854)
- Cacochroa permixtella (Herrich-Schäffer, 1854)
- Chrysoclista lathamella (T. B. Fletcher, 1936)
- Chrysoclista linneella (Clerck, 1759)
- Chrysoclista splendida Karsholt, 1997
- Depressaria absynthiella Herrich-Schäffer, 1865
- Depressaria adustatella Turati, 1927
- Depressaria albipunctella (Denis & Schiffermüller, 1775)
- Depressaria artemisiae Nickerl, 1864
- Depressaria badiella (Hübner, 1796)
- Depressaria beckmanni Heinemann, 1870
- Depressaria bupleurella Heinemann, 1870
- Depressaria chaerophylli Zeller, 1839
- Depressaria corticinella Zeller, 1854
- Depressaria daucella (Denis & Schiffermüller, 1775)
- Depressaria daucivorella Ragonot, 1889
- Depressaria depressana (Fabricius, 1775)
- Depressaria deverrella Chretien, 1915
- Depressaria discipunctella Herrich-Schäffer, 1854
- Depressaria douglasella Stainton, 1849
- Depressaria emeritella Stainton, 1849
- Depressaria eryngiella Milliere, 1881
- Depressaria gallicella Chretien, 1908
- Depressaria halophilella Chretien, 1908
- Depressaria heydenii Zeller, 1854
- Depressaria hofmanni Stainton, 1861
- Depressaria incognitella Hannemann, 1990
- Depressaria libanotidella Schlager, 1849
- Depressaria marcella Rebel, 1901
- Depressaria millefoliella Chretien, 1908
- Depressaria olerella Zeller, 1854
- Depressaria pimpinellae Zeller, 1839
- Depressaria pulcherrimella Stainton, 1849
- Depressaria radiella (Goeze, 1783)
- Depressaria radiosquamella Walsingham, 1898
- Depressaria sordidatella Tengstrom, 1848
- Depressaria tenebricosa Zeller, 1854
- Depressaria ultimella Stainton, 1849
- Depressaria ululana Rossler, 1866
- Depressaria velox Staudinger, 1859
- Depressaria erinaceella Staudinger, 1870
- Dystebenna stephensi (Stainton, 1849)
- Elachista adscitella Stainton, 1851
- Elachista agelensis Traugott-Olsen, 1996
- Elachista amparoae Traugott-Olsen, 1992
- Elachista argentella (Clerck, 1759)
- Elachista bedellella (Sircom, 1848)
- Elachista bigorrensis Traugott-Olsen, 1990
- Elachista bisulcella (Duponchel, 1843)
- Elachista cahorsensis Traugott-Olsen, 1992
- Elachista chrysodesmella Zeller, 1850
- Elachista cingillella (Herrich-Schäffer, 1855)
- Elachista clintoni Traugott-Olsen, 1992
- Elachista collitella (Duponchel, 1843)
- Elachista disemiella Zeller, 1847
- Elachista dispilella Zeller, 1839
- Elachista dispunctella (Duponchel, 1843)
- Elachista exigua Parenti, 1978
- Elachista gangabella Zeller, 1850
- Elachista gormella Nielsen & Traugott-Olsen, 1987
- Elachista hedemanni Rebel, 1899
- Elachista heringi Rebel, 1899
- Elachista klimeschiella Parenti, 2002
- Elachista lerauti Traugott-Olsen, 1992
- Elachista littoricola Le Marchand, 1938
- Elachista lugdunensis Frey, 1859
- Elachista metella Kaila, 2002
- Elachista nitidulella (Herrich-Schäffer, 1885)
- Elachista nolckeni Sulcs, 1992
- Elachista obliquella Stainton, 1854
- Elachista occulta Parenti, 1978
- Elachista parvula Parenti, 1978
- Elachista passerini Traugott-Olsen, 1996
- Elachista pollinariella Zeller, 1839
- Elachista pollutella Duponchel, 1843
- Elachista pullicomella Zeller, 1839
- Elachista revinctella Zeller, 1850
- Elachista rudectella Stainton, 1851
- Elachista squamosella (Duponchel, 1843)
- Elachista subocellea (Stephens, 1834)
- Elachista triseriatella Stainton, 1854
- Elachista unifasciella (Haworth, 1828)
- Elachista vanderwolfi Traugott-Olsen, 1992
- Elachista varensis Traugott-Olsen, 1992
- Elachista zuernbaueri Traugott-Olsen, 1990
- Elachista albidella Nylander, 1848
- Elachista albifrontella (Hübner, 1817)
- Elachista alpinella Stainton, 1854
- Elachista anserinella Zeller, 1839
- Elachista anserinelloides Nel, 2003
- Elachista apicipunctella Stainton, 1849
- Elachista atricomella Stainton, 1849
- Elachista biatomella (Stainton, 1848)
- Elachista bifasciella Treitschke, 1833
- Elachista canapennella (Hübner, 1813)
- Elachista cinereopunctella (Haworth, 1828)
- Elachista consortella Stainton, 1851
- Elachista contaminatella Zeller, 1847
- Elachista diederichsiella E. Hering, 1889
- Elachista differens Parenti, 1978
- Elachista dimicatella Rebel, 1903
- Elachista eleochariella Stainton, 1851
- Elachista exactella (Herrich-Schäffer, 1855)
- Elachista freyerella (Hübner, 1825)
- Elachista geminatella (Herrich-Schäffer, 1855)
- Elachista glaserella Traugott-Olsen, 2000
- Elachista gleichenella (Fabricius, 1781)
- Elachista griseella (Duponchel, 1843)
- Elachista herrichii Frey, 1859
- Elachista humilis Zeller, 1850
- Elachista igaloensis Amsel, 1951
- Elachista lastrella Chretien, 1896
- Elachista luticomella Zeller, 1839
- Elachista maculicerusella (Bruand, 1859)
- Elachista maculosella Chretien, 1896
- Elachista nobilella Zeller, 1839
- Elachista occidentalis Frey, 1882
- Elachista pigerella (Herrich-Schäffer, 1854)
- Elachista quadripunctella (Hübner, 1825)
- Elachista rufocinerea (Haworth, 1828)
- Elachista subnigrella Douglas, 1853
- Elachista tetragonella (Herrich-Schäffer, 1855)
- Elachista trapeziella Stainton, 1849
- Elachista utonella Frey, 1856
- Elachista zonulae Sruoga, 1992
- Ethmia aurifluella (Hübner, 1810)
- Ethmia bipunctella (Fabricius, 1775)
- Ethmia candidella (Alphéraky, 1908)
- Ethmia chrysopyga (Zeller, 1844)
- Ethmia chrysopygella (Kolenati, 1846)
- Ethmia dodecea (Haworth, 1828)
- Ethmia flavianella (Treitschke, 1832)
- Ethmia pusiella (Linnaeus, 1758)
- Ethmia quadrillella (Goeze, 1783)
- Ethmia terminella T. B. Fletcher, 1938
- Exaeretia lutosella (Herrich-Schäffer, 1854)
- Haplochrois buvati (Baldizzone, 1985)
- Haplochrois ochraceella (Rebel, 1903)
- Heinemannia albidorsella (Staudinger, 1877)
- Heinemannia festivella (Denis & Schiffermüller, 1775)
- Hypercallia citrinalis (Scopoli, 1763)
- Levipalpus hepatariella (Lienig & Zeller, 1846)
- Luquetia lobella (Denis & Schiffermüller, 1775)
- Orophia denisella (Denis & Schiffermüller, 1775)
- Orophia ferrugella (Denis & Schiffermüller, 1775)
- Orophia sordidella (Hübner, 1796)
- Perittia farinella (Thunberg, 1794)
- Perittia herrichiella (Herrich-Schäffer, 1855)
- Perittia obscurepunctella (Stainton, 1848)
- Semioscopis avellanella (Hübner, 1793)
- Semioscopis oculella (Thunberg, 1794)
- Semioscopis steinkellneriana (Denis & Schiffermüller, 1775)
- Semioscopis strigulana (Denis & Schiffermüller, 1775)
- Spuleria flavicaput (Haworth, 1828)
- Stephensia abbreviatella (Stainton, 1851)
- Stephensia brunnichella (Linnaeus, 1767)
- Telechrysis tripuncta (Haworth, 1828)

== Family Endromidae ==
- Endromis versicolora (Linnaeus, 1758)

== Family Epermeniidae ==
- Epermenia aequidentellus (E. Hofmann, 1867)
- Epermenia chaerophyllella (Goeze, 1783)
- Epermenia falciformis (Haworth, 1828)
- Epermenia illigerella (Hübner, 1813)
- Epermenia insecurella (Stainton, 1854)
- Epermenia petrusellus (Heylaerts, 1883)
- Epermenia strictellus (Wocke, 1867)
- Epermenia devotella (Heyden, 1863)
- Epermenia iniquellus (Wocke, 1867)
- Epermenia pumila (Buvat & Nel, 2000)
- Epermenia ochreomaculellus (Milliere, 1854)
- Epermenia pontificella (Hübner, 1796)
- Epermenia scurella (Stainton, 1851)
- Ochromolopis ictella (Hübner, 1813)
- Ochromolopis staintonellus (Milliere, 1869)
- Phaulernis fulviguttella (Zeller, 1839)
- Phaulernis laserinella Nel, 2003
- Phaulernis rebeliella Gaedike, 1966
- Phaulernis statariella (Heyden, 1863)

== Family Erebidae ==
- Amata kruegeri (Ragusa, 1904)
- Amata phegea (Linnaeus, 1758)
- Apaidia mesogona (Godart, 1824)
- Apaidia rufeola (Rambur, 1832)
- Apopestes spectrum (Esper, 1787)
- Arctia caja (Linnaeus, 1758)
- Arctia festiva (Hufnagel, 1766)
- Arctia flavia (Fuessly, 1779)
- Arctia villica (Linnaeus, 1758)
- Arctornis l-nigrum (Muller, 1764)
- Atlantarctia tigrina (Villers, 1789)
- Atolmis rubricollis (Linnaeus, 1758)
- Autophila dilucida (Hübner, 1808)
- Autophila hirsuta (Staudinger, 1870)
- Autophila limbata (Staudinger, 1871)
- Autophila cataphanes (Hübner, 1813)
- Callimorpha dominula (Linnaeus, 1758)
- Calliteara pudibunda (Linnaeus, 1758)
- Calymma communimacula (Denis & Schiffermüller, 1775)
- Calyptra thalictri (Borkhausen, 1790)
- Catephia alchymista (Denis & Schiffermüller, 1775)
- Catocala coniuncta (Esper, 1787)
- Catocala conversa (Esper, 1783)
- Catocala dilecta (Hübner, 1808)
- Catocala diversa (Geyer, 1828)
- Catocala elocata (Esper, 1787)
- Catocala fraxini (Linnaeus, 1758)
- Catocala fulminea (Scopoli, 1763)
- Catocala nupta (Linnaeus, 1767)
- Catocala nymphaea (Esper, 1787)
- Catocala nymphagoga (Esper, 1787)
- Catocala optata (Godart, 1824)
- Catocala promissa (Denis & Schiffermüller, 1775)
- Catocala puerpera (Giorna, 1791)
- Catocala sponsa (Linnaeus, 1767)
- Chelis maculosa (Gerning, 1780)
- Chelis simplonica (Boisduval, 1840)
- Clytie illunaris (Hübner, 1813)
- Colobochyla salicalis (Denis & Schiffermüller, 1775)
- Coscinia bifasciata (Rambur, 1832)
- Coscinia cribraria (Linnaeus, 1758)
- Coscinia striata (Linnaeus, 1758)
- Cybosia mesomella (Linnaeus, 1758)
- Cymbalophora pudica (Esper, 1785)
- Diacrisia sannio (Linnaeus, 1758)
- Diaphora mendica (Clerck, 1759)
- Diaphora sordida (Hübner, 1803)
- Dicallomera fascelina (Linnaeus, 1758)
- Drasteria cailino (Lefebvre, 1827)
- Dysauxes ancilla (Linnaeus, 1767)
- Dysauxes famula (Freyer, 1836)
- Dysauxes punctata (Fabricius, 1781)
- Dysgonia algira (Linnaeus, 1767)
- Eilema caniola (Hübner, 1808)
- Eilema complana (Linnaeus, 1758)
- Eilema depressa (Esper, 1787)
- Eilema griseola (Hübner, 1803)
- Eilema lurideola (Zincken, 1817)
- Eilema lutarella (Linnaeus, 1758)
- Eilema palliatella (Scopoli, 1763)
- Eilema pseudocomplana (Daniel, 1939)
- Eilema pygmaeola (Doubleday, 1847)
- Eilema sororcula (Hufnagel, 1766)
- Eilema uniola (Rambur, 1866)
- Eublemma amoena (Hübner, 1803)
- Eublemma candidana (Fabricius, 1794)
- Eublemma elychrysi (Rambur, 1833)
- Eublemma himmighoffeni (Milliere, 1867)
- Eublemma minutata (Fabricius, 1794)
- Eublemma ostrina (Hübner, 1808)
- Eublemma parva (Hübner, 1808)
- Eublemma polygramma (Duponchel, 1842)
- Eublemma pura (Hübner, 1813)
- Eublemma purpurina (Denis & Schiffermüller, 1775)
- Eublemma scitula Rambur, 1833
- Euclidia mi (Clerck, 1759)
- Euclidia glyphica (Linnaeus, 1758)
- Euplagia quadripunctaria (Poda, 1761)
- Euproctis chrysorrhoea (Linnaeus, 1758)
- Euproctis similis (Fuessly, 1775)
- Grammia quenseli (Paykull, 1791)
- Grammodes bifasciata (Petagna, 1787)
- Grammodes stolida (Fabricius, 1775)
- Gynaephora selenitica (Esper, 1789)
- Herminia grisealis (Denis & Schiffermüller, 1775)
- Herminia tarsicrinalis (Knoch, 1782)
- Herminia tarsipennalis (Treitschke, 1835)
- Herminia tenuialis (Rebel, 1899)
- Holoarctia cervini (Fallou, 1864)
- Hypena crassalis (Fabricius, 1787)
- Hypena lividalis (Hübner, 1796)
- Hypena obesalis Treitschke, 1829
- Hypena obsitalis (Hübner, 1813)
- Hypena palpalis (Hübner, 1796)
- Hypena proboscidalis (Linnaeus, 1758)
- Hypena rostralis (Linnaeus, 1758)
- Hypenodes humidalis Doubleday, 1850
- Hyphantria cunea (Drury, 1773)
- Hyphoraia aulica (Linnaeus, 1758)
- Hyphoraia testudinaria (Geoffroy in Fourcroy, 1785)
- Idia calvaria (Denis & Schiffermüller, 1775)
- Laelia coenosa (Hübner, 1808)
- Laspeyria flexula (Denis & Schiffermüller, 1775)
- Leucoma salicis (Linnaeus, 1758)
- Lithosia quadra (Linnaeus, 1758)
- Lygephila craccae (Denis & Schiffermüller, 1775)
- Lygephila lusoria (Linnaeus, 1758)
- Lygephila pastinum (Treitschke, 1826)
- Lygephila viciae (Hübner, 1822)
- Lymantria atlantica (Rambur, 1837)
- Lymantria dispar (Linnaeus, 1758)
- Lymantria monacha (Linnaeus, 1758)
- Macrochilo cribrumalis (Hübner, 1793)
- Metachrostis dardouini (Boisduval, 1840)
- Metachrostis velox (Hübner, 1813)
- Miltochrista miniata (Forster, 1771)
- Minucia lunaris (Denis & Schiffermüller, 1775)
- Nodaria nodosalis (Herrich-Schäffer, 1851)
- Nudaria mundana (Linnaeus, 1761)
- Ocneria rubea (Denis & Schiffermüller, 1775)
- Ocnogyna corsica (Rambur, 1832)
- Ocnogyna parasita (Hübner, 1790)
- Ocnogyna zoraida (Graslin, 1837)
- Odice jucunda (Hübner, 1813)
- Odice suava (Hübner, 1813)
- Ophiusa tirhaca (Cramer, 1773)
- Orectis massiliensis (Milliere, 1864)
- Orgyia antiquoides (Hübner, 1822)
- Orgyia aurolimbata Guenee, 1835
- Orgyia corsica Boisduval, 1834
- Orgyia recens (Hübner, 1819)
- Orgyia rupestris Rambur, 1832
- Orgyia trigotephras Boisduval, 1829
- Orgyia antiqua (Linnaeus, 1758)
- Paidia rica (Freyer, 1858)
- Paracolax tristalis (Fabricius, 1794)
- Parascotia fuliginaria (Linnaeus, 1761)
- Parascotia nisseni Turati, 1905
- Parasemia plantaginis (Linnaeus, 1758)
- Parocneria detrita (Esper, 1785)
- Pechipogo plumigeralis Hübner, 1825
- Pechipogo strigilata (Linnaeus, 1758)
- Pelosia muscerda (Hufnagel, 1766)
- Pelosia obtusa (Herrich-Schäffer, 1852)
- Pericallia matronula (Linnaeus, 1758)
- Phragmatobia fuliginosa (Linnaeus, 1758)
- Phragmatobia luctifera (Denis & Schiffermüller, 1775)
- Phytometra viridaria (Clerck, 1759)
- Polypogon gryphalis (Herrich-Schäffer, 1851)
- Polypogon tentacularia (Linnaeus, 1758)
- Rhypagla lacernaria (Hübner, 1813)
- Rhyparia purpurata (Linnaeus, 1758)
- Rhyparioides metelkana (Lederer, 1861)
- Rivula sericealis (Scopoli, 1763)
- Schrankia costaestrigalis (Stephens, 1834)
- Schrankia taenialis (Hübner, 1809)
- Scoliopteryx libatrix (Linnaeus, 1758)
- Setema cereola (Hübner, 1803)
- Setina aurita (Esper, 1787)
- Setina flavicans (Geyer, 1836)
- Setina irrorella (Linnaeus, 1758)
- Setina roscida (Denis & Schiffermüller, 1775)
- Spilosoma lubricipeda (Linnaeus, 1758)
- Spilosoma lutea (Hufnagel, 1766)
- Spilosoma urticae (Esper, 1789)
- Tathorhynchus exsiccata (Lederer, 1855)
- Thumatha senex (Hübner, 1808)
- Trisateles emortualis (Denis & Schiffermüller, 1775)
- Tyria jacobaeae (Linnaeus, 1758)
- Utetheisa pulchella (Linnaeus, 1758)
- Watsonarctia deserta (Bartel, 1902)
- Zanclognatha lunalis (Scopoli, 1763)
- Zanclognatha zelleralis (Wocke, 1850)
- Zebeeba falsalis (Herrich-Schäffer, 1839)
- Zethes insularis Rambur, 1833

== Family Eriocottidae ==
- Eriocottis nicolaeella Gibeaux, 1983
- Eriocottis paradoxella (Staudinger, 1859)

== Family Eriocraniidae ==
- Dyseriocrania subpurpurella (Haworth, 1828)
- Eriocrania cicatricella (Zetterstedt, 1839)
- Eriocrania salopiella (Stainton, 1854)
- Eriocrania sangii (Wood, 1891)
- Eriocrania semipurpurella (Stephens, 1835)
- Eriocrania sparrmannella (Bosc, 1791)
- Heringocrania unimaculella (Zetterstedt, 1839)
- Paracrania chrysolepidella (Zeller, 1851)

== Family Euteliidae ==
- Eutelia adulatrix (Hübner, 1813)

== Family Gelechiidae ==
- Acompsia antirrhinella Milliere, 1866
- Acompsia cinerella (Clerck, 1759)
- Acompsia delmastroella Huemer, 1998
- Acompsia dimorpha Petry, 1904
- Acompsia minorella Rebel, 1899
- Acompsia muellerrutzi Wehrli, 1925
- Acompsia pyrenaella Huemer & Karsholt, 2002
- Acompsia tripunctella (Denis & Schiffermüller, 1775)
- Acompsia schmidtiellus (Heyden, 1848)
- Altenia scriptella (Hübner, 1796)
- Anacampsis blattariella (Hübner, 1796)
- Anacampsis hirsutella (Constant, 1885)
- Anacampsis obscurella (Denis & Schiffermüller, 1775)
- Anacampsis populella (Clerck, 1759)
- Anacampsis scintillella (Fischer von Röslerstamm, 1841)
- Anacampsis temerella (Lienig & Zeller, 1846)
- Anacampsis timidella (Wocke, 1887)
- Anacampsis trifoliella (Constant, 1890)
- Anarsia bilbainella (Rossler, 1877)
- Anarsia dejoannisi Real, 1994
- Anarsia leberonella Real, 1994
- Anarsia lineatella Zeller, 1839
- Anarsia spartiella (Schrank, 1802)
- Anasphaltis renigerellus (Zeller, 1839)
- Apatetris mediterranella Nel & Varenne, 2012
- Apodia bifractella (Duponchel, 1843)
- Aproaerema anthyllidella (Hübner, 1813)
- Argolamprotes micella (Denis & Schiffermüller, 1775)
- Aristotelia billii Varenne & J. Nel, 2013
- Aristotelia brizella (Treitschke, 1833)
- Aristotelia decoratella (Staudinger, 1879)
- Aristotelia decurtella (Hübner, 1813)
- Aristotelia ericinella (Zeller, 1839)
- Aristotelia frankeniae Walsingham, 1898
- Aristotelia heliacella (Herrich-Schäffer, 1854)
- Aristotelia staticella Milliere, 1876
- Aristotelia subdecurtella (Stainton, 1859)
- Aristotelia subericinella (Duponchel, 1843)
- Aroga aristotelis (Milliere, 1876)
- Aroga flavicomella (Zeller, 1839)
- Aroga pascuicola (Staudinger, 1871)
- Aroga temporariella Sattler, 1960
- Aroga velocella (Duponchel, 1838)
- Athrips amoenella (Frey, 1882)
- Athrips asarinella (Chretien, 1930)
- Athrips medjella (Chretien, 1900)
- Athrips mouffetella (Linnaeus, 1758)
- Athrips nigricostella (Duponchel, 1842)
- Athrips pruinosella (Lienig & Zeller, 1846)
- Athrips rancidella (Herrich-Schäffer, 1854)
- Athrips tetrapunctella (Thunberg, 1794)
- Athrips thymifoliella (Constant, 1893)
- Atremaea lonchoptera Staudinger, 1871
- Brachmia blandella (Fabricius, 1798)
- Brachmia dimidiella (Denis & Schiffermüller, 1775)
- Brachmia inornatella (Douglas, 1850)
- Bryotropha affinis (Haworth, 1828)
- Bryotropha arabica Amsel, 1952
- Bryotropha basaltinella (Zeller, 1839)
- Bryotropha boreella (Douglas, 1851)
- Bryotropha desertella (Douglas, 1850)
- Bryotropha domestica (Haworth, 1828)
- Bryotropha dryadella (Zeller, 1850)
- Bryotropha figulella (Staudinger, 1859)
- Bryotropha galbanella (Zeller, 1839)
- Bryotropha gallurella Amsel, 1952
- Bryotropha pallorella Amsel, 1952
- Bryotropha plebejella (Zeller, 1847)
- Bryotropha politella (Stainton, 1851)
- Bryotropha sattleri Nel, 2003
- Bryotropha senectella (Zeller, 1839)
- Bryotropha similis (Stainton, 1854)
- Bryotropha terrella (Denis & Schiffermüller, 1775)
- Bryotropha umbrosella (Zeller, 1839)
- Bryotropha vondermuhlli Nel & Brusseaux, 2003
- Carpatolechia aenigma (Sattler, 1983)
- Carpatolechia alburnella (Zeller, 1839)
- Carpatolechia decorella (Haworth, 1812)
- Carpatolechia fugacella (Zeller, 1839)
- Carpatolechia fugitivella (Zeller, 1839)
- Carpatolechia notatella (Hübner, 1813)
- Carpatolechia proximella (Hübner, 1796)
- Caryocolum albifaciella (Heinemann, 1870)
- Caryocolum alsinella (Zeller, 1868)
- Caryocolum blandella (Douglas, 1852)
- Caryocolum blandelloides Karsholt, 1981
- Caryocolum blandulella (Tutt, 1887)
- Caryocolum bosalella (Rebel, 1936)
- Caryocolum cassella (Walker, 1864)
- Caryocolum cauligenella (Schmid, 1863)
- Caryocolum dauphini Grange & Nel, 2012
- Caryocolum delphinatella (Constant, 1890)
- Caryocolum fibigerium Huemer, 1988
- Caryocolum fischerella (Treitschke, 1833)
- Caryocolum fraternella (Douglas, 1851)
- Caryocolum gallagenellum Huemer, 1989
- Caryocolum huebneri (Haworth, 1828)
- Caryocolum interalbicella (Herrich-Schäffer, 1854)
- Caryocolum junctella (Douglas, 1851)
- Caryocolum klosi (Rebel, 1917)
- Caryocolum kroesmanniella (Herrich-Schäffer, 1854)
- Caryocolum leucomelanella (Zeller, 1839)
- Caryocolum leucothoracellum (Klimesch, 1953)
- Caryocolum marmorea (Haworth, 1828)
- Caryocolum mazeli Huemer & Nel, 2005
- Caryocolum moehringiae (Klimesch, 1954)
- Caryocolum mucronatella (Chretien, 1900)
- Caryocolum peregrinella (Herrich-Schäffer, 1854)
- Caryocolum petrophila (Preissecker, 1914)
- Caryocolum petryi (O. Hofmann, 1899)
- Caryocolum provinciella (Stainton, 1869)
- Caryocolum proxima (Haworth, 1828)
- Caryocolum repentis Huemer & Luquet, 1992
- Caryocolum saginella (Zeller, 1868)
- Caryocolum schleichi (Christoph, 1872)
- Caryocolum tischeriella (Zeller, 1839)
- Caryocolum tricolorella (Haworth, 1812)
- Caryocolum vicinella (Douglas, 1851)
- Caryocolum viscariella (Stainton, 1855)
- Catatinagma trivittellum Rebel, 1903
- Caulastrocecis gypsella (Constant, 1893)
- Chionodes apolectella (Walsingham, 1900)
- Chionodes continuella (Zeller, 1839)
- Chionodes distinctella (Zeller, 1839)
- Chionodes electella (Zeller, 1839)
- Chionodes fumatella (Douglas, 1850)
- Chionodes holosericella (Herrich-Schäffer, 1854)
- Chionodes lugubrella (Fabricius, 1794)
- Chionodes nebulosella (Heinemann, 1870)
- Chionodes perpetuella (Herrich-Schäffer, 1854)
- Chionodes tragicella (Heyden, 1865)
- Chionodes viduella (Fabricius, 1794)
- Chrysoesthia atriplicella (Amsel, 1939)
- Chrysoesthia drurella (Fabricius, 1775)
- Chrysoesthia eppelsheimi (Staudinger, 1885)
- Chrysoesthia sexguttella (Thunberg, 1794)
- Coleotechnites piceaella (Kearfott, 1903)
- Cosmardia moritzella (Treitschke, 1835)
- Crossobela trinotella (Herrich-Schäffer, 1856)
- Dactylotula altithermella (Walsingham, 1903)
- Dactylotula kinkerella (Snellen, 1876)
- Deltophora stictella (Rebel, 1927)
- Dichomeris acuminatus (Staudinger, 1876)
- Dichomeris alacella (Zeller, 1839)
- Dichomeris derasella (Denis & Schiffermüller, 1775)
- Dichomeris helianthemi (Walsingham, 1903)
- Dichomeris juniperella (Linnaeus, 1761)
- Dichomeris lamprostoma (Zeller, 1847)
- Dichomeris limbipunctellus (Staudinger, 1859)
- Dichomeris limosellus (Schlager, 1849)
- Dichomeris marginella (Fabricius, 1781)
- Dichomeris rasilella (Herrich-Schäffer, 1854)
- Dichomeris ustalella (Fabricius, 1794)
- Ephysteris deserticolella (Staudinger, 1871)
- Ephysteris diminutella (Zeller, 1847)
- Ephysteris iberica Povolny, 1977
- Ephysteris insulella (Heinemann, 1870)
- Ephysteris inustella (Zeller, 1847)
- Ephysteris olympica Povolny, 1968
- Ephysteris promptella (Staudinger, 1859)
- Epidola barcinonella Milliere, 1867
- Epidola nuraghella Hartig, 1939
- Epidola stigma Staudinger, 1859
- Eulamprotes atrella (Denis & Schiffermüller, 1775)
- Eulamprotes buvati Leraut, 1991
- Eulamprotes helotella (Staudinger, 1859)
- Eulamprotes immaculatella (Douglas, 1850)
- Eulamprotes libertinella (Zeller, 1872)
- Eulamprotes mirusella Huemer & Karsholt, 2013
- Eulamprotes nigromaculella (Milliere, 1872)
- Eulamprotes occidentella Huemer & Karsholt, 2011
- Eulamprotes parahelotella Nel, 1995
- Eulamprotes superbella (Zeller, 1839)
- Eulamprotes unicolorella (Duponchel, 1843)
- Eulamprotes wilkella (Linnaeus, 1758)
- Exoteleia dodecella (Linnaeus, 1758)
- Exoteleia succinctella (Zeller, 1872)
- Filatima angustipennis Sattler, 1961
- Filatima spurcella (Duponchel, 1843)
- Filatima tephritidella (Duponchel, 1844)
- Filatima textorella (Chretien, 1908)
- Gelechia asinella (Hübner, 1796)
- Gelechia aspoecki Huemer, 1992
- Gelechia basipunctella Herrich-Schäffer, 1854
- Gelechia dujardini Huemer, 1991
- Gelechia hippophaella (Schrank, 1802)
- Gelechia mediterranea Huemer, 1991
- Gelechia muscosella Zeller, 1839
- Gelechia nervosella (Zerny, 1927)
- Gelechia nigra (Haworth, 1828)
- Gelechia rhombella (Denis & Schiffermüller, 1775)
- Gelechia sabinellus (Zeller, 1839)
- Gelechia scotinella Herrich-Schäffer, 1854
- Gelechia senticetella (Staudinger, 1859)
- Gelechia sestertiella Herrich-Schäffer, 1854
- Gelechia sororculella (Hübner, 1817)
- Gelechia turpella (Denis & Schiffermüller, 1775)
- Gladiovalva rumicivorella (Milliere, 1881)
- Gnorimoschema epithymella (Staudinger, 1859)
- Gnorimoschema herbichii (Nowicki, 1864)
- Gnorimoschema soffneri Riedl, 1965
- Gnorimoschema steueri Povolny, 1975
- Gnorimoschema valesiella (Staudinger, 1877)
- Helcystogramma lineolella (Zeller, 1839)
- Helcystogramma lutatella (Herrich-Schäffer, 1854)
- Helcystogramma rufescens (Haworth, 1828)
- Helcystogramma triannulella (Herrich-Schäffer, 1854)
- Hypatima rhomboidella (Linnaeus, 1758)
- Isophrictis anthemidella (Wocke, 1871)
- Isophrictis corsicella Amsel, 1936
- Isophrictis invisella (Constant, 1885)
- Isophrictis kefersteiniellus (Zeller, 1850)
- Isophrictis lineatellus (Zeller, 1850)
- Isophrictis meridionella (Herrich-Schäffer, 1854)
- Isophrictis robinella (Chretien, 1907)
- Isophrictis striatella (Denis & Schiffermüller, 1775)
- Istrianis myricariella (Frey, 1870)
- Iwaruna biguttella (Duponchel, 1843)
- Iwaruna klimeschi Wolff, 1958
- Klimeschiopsis kiningerella (Duponchel, 1843)
- Megacraspedus balneariellus (Chretien, 1907)
- Megacraspedus cuencellus Caradja, 1920
- Megacraspedus dolosellus (Zeller, 1839)
- Megacraspedus fallax (Mann, 1867)
- Megacraspedus lanceolellus (Zeller, 1850)
- Megacraspedus pentheres Walsingham, 1920
- Megacraspedus separatellus (Fischer von Röslerstamm, 1843)
- Megacraspedus subdolellus Staudinger, 1859
- Megacraspedus tristictus Walsingham, 1910
- Megacraspedus tutti Walsingham, 1897
- Mesophleps corsicella Herrich-Schäffer, 1856
- Mesophleps ochracella (Turati, 1926)
- Mesophleps oxycedrella (Milliere, 1871)
- Mesophleps silacella (Hübner, 1796)
- Metzneria aestivella (Zeller, 1839)
- Metzneria aprilella (Herrich-Schäffer, 1854)
- Metzneria artificella (Herrich-Schäffer, 1861)
- Metzneria campicolella (Mann, 1857)
- Metzneria diffusella Englert, 1974
- Metzneria ehikeella Gozmany, 1954
- Metzneria hilarella Caradja, 1920
- Metzneria intestinella (Mann, 1864)
- Metzneria lappella (Linnaeus, 1758)
- Metzneria littorella (Douglas, 1850)
- Metzneria metzneriella (Stainton, 1851)
- Metzneria neuropterella (Zeller, 1839)
- Metzneria paucipunctella (Zeller, 1839)
- Metzneria santolinella (Amsel, 1936)
- Metzneria staehelinella Englert, 1974
- Metzneria subflavella Englert, 1974
- Metzneria tenuiella (Mann, 1864)
- Metzneria tristella Rebel, 1901
- Metzneria varennei Nel, 1997
- Microlechia chretieni Turati, 1924
- Mirificarma burdonella (Rebel, 1930)
- Mirificarma cytisella (Treitschke, 1833)
- Mirificarma eburnella (Denis & Schiffermüller, 1775)
- Mirificarma flavella (Duponchel, 1844)
- Mirificarma interrupta (Curtis, 1827)
- Mirificarma lentiginosella (Zeller, 1839)
- Mirificarma maculatella (Hübner, 1796)
- Mirificarma mulinella (Zeller, 1839)
- Mirificarma ulicinella (Staudinger, 1859)
- Monochroa arundinetella (Boyd, 1857)
- Monochroa bronzella Karsholt, Nel, Fournier, Varenne & Huemer, 2013
- Monochroa conspersella (Herrich-Schäffer, 1854)
- Monochroa cytisella (Curtis, 1837)
- Monochroa dellabeffai (Rebel, 1932)
- Monochroa divisella (Douglas, 1850)
- Monochroa elongella (Heinemann, 1870)
- Monochroa ferrea (Frey, 1870)
- Monochroa hornigi (Staudinger, 1883)
- Monochroa inflexella Svensson, 1992
- Monochroa lucidella (Stephens, 1834)
- Monochroa lutulentella (Zeller, 1839)
- Monochroa melagonella (Constant, 1895)
- Monochroa palustrellus (Douglas, 1850)
- Monochroa parvulata (Gozmany, 1957)
- Monochroa rumicetella (O. Hofmann, 1868)
- Monochroa sperata Huemer & Karsholt, 2010
- Monochroa suffusella (Douglas, 1850)
- Monochroa tenebrella (Hübner, 1817)
- Neofaculta ericetella (Geyer, 1832)
- Neofaculta infernella (Herrich-Schäffer, 1854)
- Neofriseria peliella (Treitschke, 1835)
- Neofriseria singula (Staudinger, 1876)
- Neotelphusa cisti (Stainton, 1869)
- Neotelphusa huemeri Nel, 1998
- Neotelphusa sequax (Haworth, 1828)
- Nothris congressariella (Bruand, 1858)
- Nothris lemniscellus (Zeller, 1839)
- Nothris verbascella (Denis & Schiffermüller, 1775)
- Oecocecis guyonella Guenee, 1870
- Ornativalva plutelliformis (Staudinger, 1859)
- Ornativalva pseudotamaricella Sattler, 1967
- Palumbina guerinii (Stainton, 1858)
- Parachronistis albiceps (Zeller, 1839)
- Paranarsia joannisiella Ragonot, 1895
- Parapodia sinaica (Frauenfeld, 1859)
- Parastenolechia nigrinotella (Zeller, 1847)
- Pexicopia malvella (Hübner, 1805)
- Phthorimaea operculella (Zeller, 1873)
- Platyedra subcinerea (Haworth, 1828)
- Pogochaetia solitaria Staudinger, 1879
- Prolita sexpunctella (Fabricius, 1794)
- Prolita solutella (Zeller, 1839)
- Psamathocrita osseella (Stainton, 1860)
- Pseudosophronia constanti (Nel, 1998)
- Pseudosophronia cosmella Constant, 1885
- Pseudosophronia exustellus (Zeller, 1847)
- Pseudotelphusa occidentella Huemer & Karsholt, 1999
- Pseudotelphusa paripunctella (Thunberg, 1794)
- Pseudotelphusa scalella (Scopoli, 1763)
- Pseudotelphusa tessella (Linnaeus, 1758)
- Psoricoptera gibbosella (Zeller, 1839)
- Psoricoptera speciosella Teich, 1893
- Ptocheuusa inopella (Zeller, 1839)
- Ptocheuusa paupella (Zeller, 1847)
- Pyncostola bohemiella (Nickerl, 1864)
- Recurvaria leucatella (Clerck, 1759)
- Recurvaria nanella (Denis & Schiffermüller, 1775)
- Recurvaria thomeriella (Chretien, 1901)
- Sattleria angustispina Pitkin & Sattler, 1991
- Sattleria arcuata Pitkin & Sattler, 1991
- Sattleria breviramus Pitkin & Sattler, 1991
- Sattleria izoardi Huemer & Sattler, 1992
- Sattleria marguareisi Huemer & Sattler, 1992
- Sattleria melaleucella (Constant, 1865)
- Sattleria pyrenaica (Petry, 1904)
- Sattleria triglavica Povolny, 1987
- Schistophila laurocistella Chretien, 1899
- Scrobipalpa acuminatella (Sircom, 1850)
- Scrobipalpa amseli Povolny, 1966
- Scrobipalpa artemisiella (Treitschke, 1833)
- Scrobipalpa atriplicella (Fischer von Röslerstamm, 1841)
- Scrobipalpa bigoti Povolny, 1973
- Scrobipalpa bradleyi Povolny, 1971
- Scrobipalpa brahmiella (Heyden, 1862)
- Scrobipalpa camphorosmella Nel, 1999
- Scrobipalpa costella (Humphreys & Westwood, 1845)
- Scrobipalpa ergasima (Meyrick, 1916)
- Scrobipalpa gallicella (Constant, 1885)
- Scrobipalpa halimioniella Huemer & Karsholt, 2010
- Scrobipalpa halonella (Herrich-Schäffer, 1854)
- Scrobipalpa halymella (Milliere, 1864)
- Scrobipalpa hyoscyamella (Stainton, 1869)
- Scrobipalpa hyssopi Nel, 2003
- Scrobipalpa instabilella (Douglas, 1846)
- Scrobipalpa monochromella (Constant, 1895)
- Scrobipalpa montanella (Chretien, 1910)
- Scrobipalpa murinella (Duponchel, 1843)
- Scrobipalpa nitentella (Fuchs, 1902)
- Scrobipalpa obsoletella (Fischer von Röslerstamm, 1841)
- Scrobipalpa ocellatella (Boyd, 1858)
- Scrobipalpa pauperella (Heinemann, 1870)
- Scrobipalpa perinii (Klimesch, 1951)
- Scrobipalpa phagnalella (Constant, 1895)
- Scrobipalpa portosanctana (Stainton, 1859)
- Scrobipalpa proclivella (Fuchs, 1886)
- Scrobipalpa salicorniae (E. Hering, 1889)
- Scrobipalpa salinella (Zeller, 1847)
- Scrobipalpa samadensis (Pfaffenzeller, 1870)
- Scrobipalpa spergulariella (Chretien, 1910)
- Scrobipalpa suaedella (Richardson, 1893)
- Scrobipalpa suaedicola (Mabille, 1906)
- Scrobipalpa suasella (Constant, 1895)
- Scrobipalpa superstes Povolny, 1977
- Scrobipalpa traganella (Chretien, 1915)
- Scrobipalpa vasconiella (Rossler, 1877)
- Scrobipalpa voltinella (Chretien, 1898)
- Scrobipalpula diffluella (Frey, 1870)
- Scrobipalpula psilella (Herrich-Schäffer, 1854)
- Scrobipalpula ramosella (Muller-Rutz, 1934)
- Scrobipalpula tussilaginis (Stainton, 1867)
- Sitotroga cerealella (Olivier, 1789)
- Sitotroga psacasta Meyrick, 1908
- Sophronia chilonella (Treitschke, 1833)
- Sophronia humerella (Denis & Schiffermüller, 1775)
- Sophronia semicostella (Hübner, 1813)
- Sophronia sicariellus (Zeller, 1839)
- Stenolechia gemmella (Linnaeus, 1758)
- Stenolechiodes pseudogemmellus Elsner, 1996
- Stomopteryx basalis (Staudinger, 1876)
- Stomopteryx detersella (Zeller, 1847)
- Stomopteryx flavipalpella Jackh, 1959
- Stomopteryx hungaricella Gozmany, 1957
- Stomopteryx remissella (Zeller, 1847)
- Syncopacma albifrontella (Heinemann, 1870)
- Syncopacma albipalpella (Herrich-Schäffer, 1854)
- Syncopacma buvati Nel, 1995
- Syncopacma captivella (Herrich-Schäffer, 1854)
- Syncopacma cinctella (Clerck, 1759)
- Syncopacma cincticulella (Bruand, 1851)
- Syncopacma coronillella (Treitschke, 1833)
- Syncopacma larseniella Gozmany, 1957
- Syncopacma linella (Chretien, 1904)
- Syncopacma montanata Gozmany, 1957
- Syncopacma patruella (Mann, 1857)
- Syncopacma polychromella (Rebel, 1902)
- Syncopacma sangiella (Stainton, 1863)
- Syncopacma suecicella (Wolff, 1958)
- Syncopacma taeniolella (Zeller, 1839)
- Teleiodes italica Huemer, 1992
- Teleiodes luculella (Hübner, 1813)
- Teleiodes saltuum (Zeller, 1878)
- Teleiodes vulgella (Denis & Schiffermüller, 1775)
- Teleiodes wagae (Nowicki, 1860)
- Teleiopsis albifemorella (E. Hofmann, 1867)
- Teleiopsis bagriotella (Duponchel, 1840)
- Teleiopsis diffinis (Haworth, 1828)
- Teleiopsis rosalbella (Fologne, 1862)
- Telphusa cistiflorella (Constant, 1890)
- Thiotricha coleella (Constant, 1885)
- Thiotricha majorella (Rebel, 1910)
- Thiotricha subocellea (Stephens, 1834)
- Tila capsophilella (Chretien, 1900)
- Tuta absoluta (Meyrick, 1917)
- Xenolechia aethiops (Humphreys & Westwood, 1845)
- Xystophora carchariella (Zeller, 1839)
- Xystophora pulveratella (Herrich-Schäffer, 1854)

== Family Geometridae ==
- Abraxas grossulariata (Linnaeus, 1758)
- Abraxas pantaria (Linnaeus, 1767)
- Abraxas sylvata (Scopoli, 1763)
- Acasis appensata (Eversmann, 1842)
- Acasis viretata (Hübner, 1799)
- Adactylotis contaminaria (Hübner, 1813)
- Adactylotis gesticularia (Hübner, 1817)
- Adalbertia castiliaria (Staudinger, 1900)
- Aethalura punctulata (Denis & Schiffermüller, 1775)
- Agriopis aurantiaria (Hübner, 1799)
- Agriopis bajaria (Denis & Schiffermüller, 1775)
- Agriopis leucophaearia (Denis & Schiffermüller, 1775)
- Agriopis marginaria (Fabricius, 1776)
- Alcis bastelbergeri (Hirschke, 1908)
- Alcis jubata (Thunberg, 1788)
- Alcis repandata (Linnaeus, 1758)
- Aleucis distinctata (Herrich-Schäffer, 1839)
- Alsophila aceraria (Denis & Schiffermüller, 1775)
- Alsophila aescularia (Denis & Schiffermüller, 1775)
- Angerona prunaria (Linnaeus, 1758)
- Anthometra plumularia Boisduval, 1840
- Anticlea derivata (Denis & Schiffermüller, 1775)
- Anticollix sparsata (Treitschke, 1828)
- Antilurga alhambrata (Staudinger, 1859)
- Apeira syringaria (Linnaeus, 1758)
- Aplasta ononaria (Fuessly, 1783)
- Aplocera corsalta (Schawerda, 1928)
- Aplocera efformata (Guenee, 1858)
- Aplocera plagiata (Linnaeus, 1758)
- Aplocera praeformata (Hübner, 1826)
- Aplocera simpliciata (Treitschke, 1835)
- Apocheima hispidaria (Denis & Schiffermüller, 1775)
- Archiearis parthenias (Linnaeus, 1761)
- Arichanna melanaria (Linnaeus, 1758)
- Ascotis selenaria (Denis & Schiffermüller, 1775)
- Aspitates gilvaria (Denis & Schiffermüller, 1775)
- Aspitates ochrearia (Rossi, 1794)
- Asthena albulata (Hufnagel, 1767)
- Asthena anseraria (Herrich-Schäffer, 1855)
- Athroolopha pennigeraria (Hübner, 1813)
- Baptria tibiale (Esper, 1791)
- Biston betularia (Linnaeus, 1758)
- Biston strataria (Hufnagel, 1767)
- Boudinotiana notha (Hübner, 1803)
- Boudinotiana touranginii (Berce, 1870)
- Bupalus piniaria (Linnaeus, 1758)
- Cabera exanthemata (Scopoli, 1763)
- Cabera pusaria (Linnaeus, 1758)
- Calamodes occitanaria (Duponchel, 1829)
- Campaea honoraria (Denis & Schiffermüller, 1775)
- Campaea margaritaria (Linnaeus, 1761)
- Camptogramma bilineata (Linnaeus, 1758)
- Camptogramma scripturata (Hübner, 1799)
- Carsia lythoxylata (Hübner, 1799)
- Carsia sororiata (Hübner, 1813)
- Casilda consecraria (Staudinger, 1871)
- Cataclysme dissimilata (Rambur, 1833)
- Cataclysme riguata (Hübner, 1813)
- Cataclysme uniformata (Bellier, 1862)
- Catarhoe basochesiata (Duponchel, 1831)
- Catarhoe cuculata (Hufnagel, 1767)
- Catarhoe mazeli Viidalepp, 2008
- Catarhoe permixtaria (Herrich-Schäffer, 1856)
- Catarhoe putridaria (Herrich-Schäffer, 1852)
- Catarhoe rubidata (Denis & Schiffermüller, 1775)
- Cepphis advenaria (Hübner, 1790)
- Chariaspilates formosaria (Eversmann, 1837)
- Charissa bellieri (Oberthur, 1913)
- Charissa obscurata (Denis & Schiffermüller, 1775)
- Charissa crenulata (Staudinger, 1871)
- Charissa italohelveticus (Rezbanyai-Reser, 1986)
- Charissa pullata (Denis & Schiffermüller, 1775)
- Charissa corsica (Oberthur, 1913)
- Charissa mucidaria (Hübner, 1799)
- Charissa variegata (Duponchel, 1830)
- Charissa ambiguata (Duponchel, 1830)
- Charissa onustaria (Herrich-Schäffer, 1852)
- Charissa glaucinaria (Hübner, 1799)
- Chemerina caliginearia (Rambur, 1833)
- Chesias isabella Schawerda, 1915
- Chesias legatella (Denis & Schiffermüller, 1775)
- Chesias rufata (Fabricius, 1775)
- Chiasmia aestimaria (Hübner, 1809)
- Chiasmia clathrata (Linnaeus, 1758)
- Chlorissa cloraria (Hübner, 1813)
- Chlorissa viridata (Linnaeus, 1758)
- Chloroclysta miata (Linnaeus, 1758)
- Chloroclysta siterata (Hufnagel, 1767)
- Chloroclystis v-ata (Haworth, 1809)
- Cidaria fulvata (Forster, 1771)
- Cleora cinctaria (Denis & Schiffermüller, 1775)
- Cleorodes lichenaria (Hufnagel, 1767)
- Cleta filacearia (Herrich-Schäffer, 1847)
- Coenocalpe lapidata (Hübner, 1809)
- Coenocalpe millierata (Staudinger, 1901)
- Coenotephria ablutaria (Boisduval, 1840)
- Coenotephria salicata (Denis & Schiffermüller, 1775)
- Coenotephria tophaceata (Denis & Schiffermüller, 1775)
- Colostygia aptata (Hübner, 1813)
- Colostygia aqueata (Hübner, 1813)
- Colostygia cyrnea (Wehrli, 1925)
- Colostygia kollariaria (Herrich-Schäffer, 1848)
- Colostygia laetaria (de La Harpe, 1853)
- Colostygia multistrigaria (Haworth, 1809)
- Colostygia olivata (Denis & Schiffermüller, 1775)
- Colostygia pectinataria (Knoch, 1781)
- Colostygia stilpna (Prout, 1924)
- Colostygia turbata (Hübner, 1799)
- Colotois pennaria (Linnaeus, 1761)
- Comibaena bajularia (Denis & Schiffermüller, 1775)
- Compsoptera jourdanaria (Serres, 1826)
- Compsoptera opacaria (Hübner, 1819)
- Cosmorhoe ocellata (Linnaeus, 1758)
- Costaconvexa polygrammata (Borkhausen, 1794)
- Crocallis dardoinaria Donzel, 1840
- Crocallis elinguaria (Linnaeus, 1758)
- Crocallis tusciaria (Borkhausen, 1793)
- Crocota peletieraria (Duponchel, 1830)
- Crocota pseudotinctaria Leraut, 1999
- Crocota tinctaria (Hübner, 1799)
- Cyclophora linearia (Hübner, 1799)
- Cyclophora porata (Linnaeus, 1767)
- Cyclophora punctaria (Linnaeus, 1758)
- Cyclophora suppunctaria (Zeller, 1847)
- Cyclophora albiocellaria (Hübner, 1789)
- Cyclophora albipunctata (Hufnagel, 1767)
- Cyclophora annularia (Fabricius, 1775)
- Cyclophora pendularia (Clerck, 1759)
- Cyclophora puppillaria (Hübner, 1799)
- Cyclophora quercimontaria (Bastelberger, 1897)
- Cyclophora ruficiliaria (Herrich-Schäffer, 1855)
- Deileptenia ribeata (Clerck, 1759)
- Digrammia rippertaria (Duponchel, 1830)
- Dyscia conspersaria (Denis & Schiffermüller, 1775)
- Dyscia innocentaria (Christoph, 1885)
- Dyscia raunaria (Freyer, 1852)
- Dyscia fagaria (Thunberg, 1784)
- Dyscia penulataria (Hübner, 1819)
- Dyscia lentiscaria (Donzel, 1837)
- Dysstroma citrata (Linnaeus, 1761)
- Dysstroma truncata (Hufnagel, 1767)
- Earophila badiata (Denis & Schiffermüller, 1775)
- Ecleora solieraria (Rambur, 1834)
- Ecliptopera capitata (Herrich-Schäffer, 1839)
- Ecliptopera silaceata (Denis & Schiffermüller, 1775)
- Ectropis crepuscularia (Denis & Schiffermüller, 1775)
- Ekboarmia fascinataria (Staudinger, 1900)
- Ekboarmia sagnesi Dufay, 1979
- Electrophaes corylata (Thunberg, 1792)
- Elophos caelibaria (Heydenreich, 1851)
- Elophos unicoloraria (Staudinger, 1871)
- Elophos dilucidaria (Denis & Schiffermüller, 1775)
- Elophos dognini (Thierry-Mieg, 1910)
- Elophos serotinaria (Denis & Schiffermüller, 1775)
- Elophos sproengertsi (Pungeler, 1914)
- Elophos vittaria (Thunberg, 1788)
- Ematurga atomaria (Linnaeus, 1758)
- Emmiltis pygmaearia (Hübner, 1809)
- Ennomos alniaria (Linnaeus, 1758)
- Ennomos autumnaria (Werneburg, 1859)
- Ennomos erosaria (Denis & Schiffermüller, 1775)
- Ennomos fuscantaria (Haworth, 1809)
- Ennomos quercaria (Hübner, 1813)
- Ennomos quercinaria (Hufnagel, 1767)
- Entephria caesiata (Denis & Schiffermüller, 1775)
- Entephria contestata (Vorbrodt & Muller-Rutz, 1913)
- Entephria cyanata (Hübner, 1809)
- Entephria flavicinctata (Hübner, 1813)
- Entephria infidaria (de La Harpe, 1853)
- Entephria nobiliaria (Herrich-Schäffer, 1852)
- Epilobophora sabinata (Geyer, 1831)
- Epione repandaria (Hufnagel, 1767)
- Epione vespertaria (Linnaeus, 1767)
- Epirranthis diversata (Denis & Schiffermüller, 1775)
- Epirrhoe alternata (Muller, 1764)
- Epirrhoe galiata (Denis & Schiffermüller, 1775)
- Epirrhoe hastulata (Hübner, 1790)
- Epirrhoe molluginata (Hübner, 1813)
- Epirrhoe pupillata (Thunberg, 1788)
- Epirrhoe rivata (Hübner, 1813)
- Epirrhoe timozzaria (Constant, 1884)
- Epirrhoe tristata (Linnaeus, 1758)
- Epirrita autumnata (Borkhausen, 1794)
- Epirrita christyi (Allen, 1906)
- Epirrita dilutata (Denis & Schiffermüller, 1775)
- Erannis defoliaria (Clerck, 1759)
- Euchoeca nebulata (Scopoli, 1763)
- Eucrostes indigenata (de Villers, 1789)
- Eulithis mellinata (Fabricius, 1787)
- Eulithis populata (Linnaeus, 1758)
- Eulithis prunata (Linnaeus, 1758)
- Eulithis testata (Linnaeus, 1761)
- Euphyia biangulata (Haworth, 1809)
- Euphyia frustata (Treitschke, 1828)
- Euphyia unangulata (Haworth, 1809)
- Eupithecia abbreviata Stephens, 1831
- Eupithecia abietaria (Goeze, 1781)
- Eupithecia absinthiata (Clerck, 1759)
- Eupithecia actaeata Walderdorff, 1869
- Eupithecia alliaria Staudinger, 1870
- Eupithecia analoga Djakonov, 1926
- Eupithecia assimilata Doubleday, 1856
- Eupithecia breviculata (Donzel, 1837)
- Eupithecia carpophagata Staudinger, 1871
- Eupithecia cauchiata (Duponchel, 1831)
- Eupithecia centaureata (Denis & Schiffermüller, 1775)
- Eupithecia cocciferata Milliere, 1864
- Eupithecia conterminata (Lienig, 1846)
- Eupithecia cooptata Dietze, 1903
- Eupithecia cretaceata (Packard, 1874)
- Eupithecia denotata (Hübner, 1813)
- Eupithecia denticulata (Treitschke, 1828)
- Eupithecia dissertata (Pungeler, 1905)
- Eupithecia distinctaria Herrich-Schäffer, 1848
- Eupithecia dodoneata Guenee, 1858
- Eupithecia druentiata Dietze, 1902
- Eupithecia egenaria Herrich-Schäffer, 1848
- Eupithecia ericeata (Rambur, 1833)
- Eupithecia exiguata (Hübner, 1813)
- Eupithecia expallidata Doubleday, 1856
- Eupithecia extraversaria Herrich-Schäffer, 1852
- Eupithecia extremata (Fabricius, 1787)
- Eupithecia gemellata Herrich-Schäffer, 1861
- Eupithecia graphata (Treitschke, 1828)
- Eupithecia gratiosata Herrich-Schäffer, 1861
- Eupithecia gueneata Milliere, 1862
- Eupithecia haworthiata Doubleday, 1856
- Eupithecia icterata (de Villers, 1789)
- Eupithecia immundata (Lienig, 1846)
- Eupithecia impurata (Hübner, 1813)
- Eupithecia indigata (Hübner, 1813)
- Eupithecia innotata (Hufnagel, 1767)
- Eupithecia insigniata (Hübner, 1790)
- Eupithecia intricata (Zetterstedt, 1839)
- Eupithecia inturbata (Hübner, 1817)
- Eupithecia irriguata (Hübner, 1813)
- Eupithecia lanceata (Hübner, 1825)
- Eupithecia laquaearia Herrich-Schäffer, 1848
- Eupithecia lariciata (Freyer, 1841)
- Eupithecia lentiscata Mabille, 1869
- Eupithecia liguriata Milliere, 1884
- Eupithecia linariata (Denis & Schiffermüller, 1775)
- Eupithecia massiliata Milliere, 1865
- Eupithecia millefoliata Rossler, 1866
- Eupithecia nanata (Hübner, 1813)
- Eupithecia orphnata W. Petersen, 1909
- Eupithecia oxycedrata (Rambur, 1833)
- Eupithecia pauxillaria Boisduval, 1840
- Eupithecia pernotata Guenee, 1858
- Eupithecia phoeniceata (Rambur, 1834)
- Eupithecia pimpinellata (Hübner, 1813)
- Eupithecia plumbeolata (Haworth, 1809)
- Eupithecia poecilata Pungeler, 1888
- Eupithecia pulchellata Stephens, 1831
- Eupithecia pusillata (Denis & Schiffermüller, 1775)
- Eupithecia pygmaeata (Hübner, 1799)
- Eupithecia pyreneata Mabille, 1871
- Eupithecia rosmarinata Dardoin & Milliere, 1865
- Eupithecia santolinata Mabille, 1871
- Eupithecia sardoa Dietze, 1910
- Eupithecia satyrata (Hübner, 1813)
- Eupithecia schiefereri Bohatsch, 1893
- Eupithecia scopariata (Rambur, 1833)
- Eupithecia selinata Herrich-Schäffer, 1861
- Eupithecia semigraphata Bruand, 1850
- Eupithecia senorita Mironov, 2003
- Eupithecia silenata Assmann, 1848
- Eupithecia silenicolata Mabille, 1867
- Eupithecia simpliciata (Haworth, 1809)
- Eupithecia spissilineata (Metzner, 1846)
- Eupithecia subfuscata (Haworth, 1809)
- Eupithecia subumbrata (Denis & Schiffermüller, 1775)
- Eupithecia succenturiata (Linnaeus, 1758)
- Eupithecia tantillaria Boisduval, 1840
- Eupithecia tenuiata (Hübner, 1813)
- Eupithecia thalictrata (Pungeler, 1902)
- Eupithecia tripunctaria Herrich-Schäffer, 1852
- Eupithecia trisignaria Herrich-Schäffer, 1848
- Eupithecia ultimaria Boisduval, 1840
- Eupithecia undata (Freyer, 1840)
- Eupithecia unedonata Mabille, 1868
- Eupithecia valerianata (Hübner, 1813)
- Eupithecia variostrigata Alphéraky, 1876
- Eupithecia venosata (Fabricius, 1787)
- Eupithecia veratraria Herrich-Schäffer, 1848
- Eupithecia virgaureata Doubleday, 1861
- Eupithecia vulgata (Haworth, 1809)
- Eupithecia weissi Prout, 1938
- Eurranthis plummistaria (de Villers, 1789)
- Eustroma reticulata (Denis & Schiffermüller, 1775)
- Fagivorina arenaria (Hufnagel, 1767)
- Gagitodes sagittata (Fabricius, 1787)
- Gandaritis pyraliata (Denis & Schiffermüller, 1775)
- Geometra papilionaria (Linnaeus, 1758)
- Glacies alpinata (Scopoli, 1763)
- Glacies alticolaria (Mann, 1853)
- Glacies bentelii (Ratzer, 1890)
- Glacies canaliculata (Hochenwarth, 1785)
- Glacies coracina (Esper, 1805)
- Glacies noricana (Wagner, 1898)
- Gnopharmia stevenaria (Boisduval, 1840)
- Gnophos sartata Treitschke, 1827
- Gnophos furvata (Denis & Schiffermüller, 1775)
- Gnophos obfuscata (Denis & Schiffermüller, 1775)
- Gnophos dumetata Treitschke, 1827
- Gymnoscelis rufifasciata (Haworth, 1809)
- Gypsochroa renitidata (Hübner, 1817)
- Heliomata glarearia (Denis & Schiffermüller, 1775)
- Hemistola chrysoprasaria (Esper, 1795)
- Hemithea aestivaria (Hübner, 1789)
- Horisme aemulata (Hübner, 1813)
- Horisme aquata (Hübner, 1813)
- Horisme calligraphata (Herrich-Schäffer, 1838)
- Horisme corticata (Treitschke, 1835)
- Horisme radicaria (de La Harpe, 1855)
- Horisme tersata (Denis & Schiffermüller, 1775)
- Horisme vitalbata (Denis & Schiffermüller, 1775)
- Hospitalia flavolineata (Staudinger, 1883)
- Hydrelia flammeolaria (Hufnagel, 1767)
- Hydrelia sylvata (Denis & Schiffermüller, 1775)
- Hydria cervinalis (Scopoli, 1763)
- Hydria montivagata (Duponchel, 1830)
- Hydria undulata (Linnaeus, 1758)
- Hydriomena furcata (Thunberg, 1784)
- Hydriomena impluviata (Denis & Schiffermüller, 1775)
- Hydriomena ruberata (Freyer, 1831)
- Hylaea fasciaria (Linnaeus, 1758)
- Hylaea pinicolaria (Bellier, 1861)
- Hypomecis punctinalis (Scopoli, 1763)
- Hypomecis roboraria (Denis & Schiffermüller, 1775)
- Hypoxystis pluviaria (Fabricius, 1787)
- Idaea alyssumata (Milliere, 1871)
- Idaea attenuaria (Rambur, 1833)
- Idaea aureolaria (Denis & Schiffermüller, 1775)
- Idaea aversata (Linnaeus, 1758)
- Idaea belemiata (Milliere, 1868)
- Idaea biselata (Hufnagel, 1767)
- Idaea calunetaria (Staudinger, 1859)
- Idaea carvalhoi Herbulot, 1979
- Idaea cervantaria (Milliere, 1869)
- Idaea circuitaria (Hübner, 1819)
- Idaea contiguaria (Hübner, 1799)
- Idaea degeneraria (Hübner, 1799)
- Idaea determinata (Staudinger, 1876)
- Idaea deversaria (Herrich-Schäffer, 1847)
- Idaea dilutaria (Hübner, 1799)
- Idaea dimidiata (Hufnagel, 1767)
- Idaea distinctaria (Boisduval, 1840)
- Idaea dromikos Hausmann, 2004
- Idaea efflorata Zeller, 1849
- Idaea elongaria (Rambur, 1833)
- Idaea emarginata (Linnaeus, 1758)
- Idaea eugeniata (Dardoin & Milliere, 1870)
- Idaea exilaria (Guenee, 1858)
- Idaea filicata (Hübner, 1799)
- Idaea flaveolaria (Hübner, 1809)
- Idaea fuscovenosa (Goeze, 1781)
- Idaea humiliata (Hufnagel, 1767)
- Idaea incalcarata (Chretien, 1913)
- Idaea infirmaria (Rambur, 1833)
- Idaea inquinata (Scopoli, 1763)
- Idaea joannisiata (Homberg, 1911)
- Idaea laevigata (Scopoli, 1763)
- Idaea libycata (Bartel, 1906)
- Idaea litigiosaria (Boisduval, 1840)
- Idaea longaria (Herrich-Schäffer, 1852)
- Idaea luteolaria (Constant, 1863)
- Idaea macilentaria (Herrich-Schäffer, 1847)
- Idaea mancipiata (Staudinger, 1871)
- Idaea mediaria (Hübner, 1819)
- Idaea moniliata (Denis & Schiffermüller, 1775)
- Idaea muricata (Hufnagel, 1767)
- Idaea mustelata (Gumppenberg, 1892)
- Idaea nitidata (Herrich-Schäffer, 1861)
- Idaea obliquaria (Turati, 1913)
- Idaea obsoletaria (Rambur, 1833)
- Idaea ochrata (Scopoli, 1763)
- Idaea ostrinaria (Hübner, 1813)
- Idaea pallidata (Denis & Schiffermüller, 1775)
- Idaea politaria (Hübner, 1799)
- Idaea predotaria (Hartig, 1951)
- Idaea rhodogrammaria (Pungeler, 1913)
- Idaea rubraria (Staudinger, 1901)
- Idaea rufaria (Hübner, 1799)
- Idaea rusticata (Denis & Schiffermüller, 1775)
- Idaea sardoniata (Homberg, 1912)
- Idaea seriata (Schrank, 1802)
- Idaea sericeata (Hübner, 1813)
- Idaea serpentata (Hufnagel, 1767)
- Idaea spissilimbaria (Mabille, 1888)
- Idaea squalidaria (Staudinger, 1882)
- Idaea straminata (Borkhausen, 1794)
- Idaea subsaturata (Guenee, 1858)
- Idaea subsericeata (Haworth, 1809)
- Idaea sylvestraria (Hübner, 1799)
- Idaea trigeminata (Haworth, 1809)
- Idaea typicata (Guenee, 1858)
- Idaea vesubiata (Milliere, 1873)
- Isturgia arenacearia (Denis & Schiffermüller, 1775)
- Isturgia assimilaria (Rambur, 1833)
- Isturgia famula (Esper, 1787)
- Isturgia limbaria (Fabricius, 1775)
- Isturgia miniosaria (Duponchel, 1829)
- Isturgia murinaria (Denis & Schiffermüller, 1775)
- Isturgia roraria (Fabricius, 1776)
- Itame vincularia (Hübner, 1813)
- Jodis lactearia (Linnaeus, 1758)
- Jodis putata (Linnaeus, 1758)
- Lampropteryx otregiata (Metcalfe, 1917)
- Lampropteryx suffumata (Denis & Schiffermüller, 1775)
- Larentia clavaria (Haworth, 1809)
- Larentia malvata (Rambur, 1833)
- Ligdia adustata (Denis & Schiffermüller, 1775)
- Liodesina homochromata (Mabille, 1869)
- Lithostege duponcheli Prout, 1938
- Lithostege griseata (Denis & Schiffermüller, 1775)
- Lobophora halterata (Hufnagel, 1767)
- Lomaspilis marginata (Linnaeus, 1758)
- Lomographa bimaculata (Fabricius, 1775)
- Lomographa temerata (Denis & Schiffermüller, 1775)
- Lycia alpina (Sulzer, 1776)
- Lycia hirtaria (Clerck, 1759)
- Lycia isabellae (Harrison, 1914)
- Lycia pomonaria (Hübner, 1790)
- Lycia zonaria (Denis & Schiffermüller, 1775)
- Lythria cruentaria (Hufnagel, 1767)
- Lythria plumularia (Freyer, 1831)
- Lythria purpuraria (Linnaeus, 1758)
- Lythria sanguinaria (Duponchel, 1842)
- Macaria alternata (Denis & Schiffermüller, 1775)
- Macaria artesiaria (Denis & Schiffermüller, 1775)
- Macaria brunneata (Thunberg, 1784)
- Macaria carbonaria (Clerck, 1759)
- Macaria fusca (Thunberg, 1792)
- Macaria liturata (Clerck, 1759)
- Macaria notata (Linnaeus, 1758)
- Macaria signaria (Hübner, 1809)
- Macaria wauaria (Linnaeus, 1758)
- Martania taeniata (Stephens, 1831)
- Melanthia alaudaria (Freyer, 1846)
- Melanthia procellata (Denis & Schiffermüller, 1775)
- Menophra abruptaria (Thunberg, 1792)
- Menophra harterti (Rothschild, 1912)
- Menophra japygiaria (O. Costa, 1849)
- Menophra nycthemeraria (Geyer, 1831)
- Mesoleuca albicillata (Linnaeus, 1758)
- Mesotype didymata (Linnaeus, 1758)
- Mesotype parallelolineata (Retzius, 1783)
- Mesotype verberata (Scopoli, 1763)
- Microloxia herbaria (Hübner, 1813)
- Minoa murinata (Scopoli, 1763)
- Nebula achromaria (de La Harpe, 1853)
- Nebula ibericata (Staudinger, 1871)
- Nebula nebulata (Treitschke, 1828)
- Nothocasis sertata (Hübner, 1817)
- Nychiodes obscuraria (de Villers, 1789)
- Nycterosea obstipata (Fabricius, 1794)
- Oar reaumuraria (Milliere, 1864)
- Odezia atrata (Linnaeus, 1758)
- Odontopera bidentata (Clerck, 1759)
- Onychora agaritharia (Dardoin, 1842)
- Operophtera brumata (Linnaeus, 1758)
- Operophtera fagata (Scharfenberg, 1805)
- Opisthograptis luteolata (Linnaeus, 1758)
- Orthonama vittata (Borkhausen, 1794)
- Ourapteryx sambucaria (Linnaeus, 1758)
- Pachycnemia benesignata (Bellier, 1861)
- Pachycnemia hippocastanaria (Hübner, 1799)
- Pachycnemia tibiaria (Rambur, 1829)
- Paraboarmia viertlii (Bohatsch, 1883)
- Paradarisa consonaria (Hübner, 1799)
- Parectropis similaria (Hufnagel, 1767)
- Pareulype berberata (Denis & Schiffermüller, 1775)
- Pareulype casearia (Constant, 1884)
- Pasiphila chloerata (Mabille, 1870)
- Pasiphila debiliata (Hübner, 1817)
- Pasiphila rectangulata (Linnaeus, 1758)
- Pelurga comitata (Linnaeus, 1758)
- Pennithera firmata (Hübner, 1822)
- Pennithera ulicata (Rambur, 1934)
- Perconia strigillaria (Hübner, 1787)
- Peribatodes abstersaria (Boisduval, 1840)
- Peribatodes buxicolaria (Mabille, 1873)
- Peribatodes ilicaria (Geyer, 1833)
- Peribatodes perversaria (Boisduval, 1840)
- Peribatodes rhomboidaria (Denis & Schiffermüller, 1775)
- Peribatodes secundaria (Denis & Schiffermüller, 1775)
- Peribatodes subflavaria (Milliere, 1876)
- Peribatodes umbraria (Hübner, 1809)
- Perizoma affinitata (Stephens, 1831)
- Perizoma albulata (Denis & Schiffermüller, 1775)
- Perizoma alchemillata (Linnaeus, 1758)
- Perizoma bifaciata (Haworth, 1809)
- Perizoma blandiata (Denis & Schiffermüller, 1775)
- Perizoma flavofasciata (Thunberg, 1792)
- Perizoma hydrata (Treitschke, 1829)
- Perizoma incultaria (Herrich-Schäffer, 1848)
- Perizoma juracolaria (Wehrli, 1919)
- Perizoma lugdunaria (Herrich-Schäffer, 1855)
- Perizoma minorata (Treitschke, 1828)
- Perizoma obsoletata (Herrich-Schäffer, 1838)
- Petrophora binaevata (Mabille, 1869)
- Petrophora chlorosata (Scopoli, 1763)
- Petrophora convergata (de Villers, 1789)
- Petrophora narbonea (Linnaeus, 1767)
- Phaiogramma etruscaria (Zeller, 1849)
- Phaiogramma faustinata (Milliere, 1868)
- Phibalapteryx virgata (Hufnagel, 1767)
- Phigalia pilosaria (Denis & Schiffermüller, 1775)
- Philereme transversata (Hufnagel, 1767)
- Philereme vetulata (Denis & Schiffermüller, 1775)
- Plagodis dolabraria (Linnaeus, 1767)
- Plagodis pulveraria (Linnaeus, 1758)
- Plemyria rubiginata (Denis & Schiffermüller, 1775)
- Protorhoe corollaria (Herrich-Schäffer, 1848)
- Pseudopanthera macularia (Linnaeus, 1758)
- Pseudoterpna coronillaria (Hübner, 1817)
- Pseudoterpna corsicaria (Rambur, 1833)
- Pseudoterpna pruinata (Hufnagel, 1767)
- Psodos quadrifaria (Sulzer, 1776)
- Pterapherapteryx sexalata (Retzius, 1783)
- Pungeleria capreolaria (Denis & Schiffermüller, 1775)
- Rheumaptera hastata (Linnaeus, 1758)
- Rheumaptera subhastata (Nolcken, 1870)
- Rhodometra sacraria (Linnaeus, 1767)
- Rhodostrophia calabra (Petagna, 1786)
- Rhodostrophia vibicaria (Clerck, 1759)
- Rhoptria asperaria (Hübner, 1817)
- Sardocyrnia bastelicaria (Bellier, 1862)
- Schistostege decussata (Denis & Schiffermüller, 1775)
- Sciadia tenebraria (Esper, 1806)
- Scopula alba Hausmann, 1993
- Scopula asellaria (Herrich-Schäffer, 1847)
- Scopula confinaria (Herrich-Schäffer, 1847)
- Scopula emutaria (Hübner, 1809)
- Scopula floslactata (Haworth, 1809)
- Scopula imitaria (Hübner, 1799)
- Scopula immutata (Linnaeus, 1758)
- Scopula incanata (Linnaeus, 1758)
- Scopula marginepunctata (Goeze, 1781)
- Scopula minorata (Boisduval, 1833)
- Scopula rubellata (Gumppenberg, 1892)
- Scopula rufomixtaria (de Graslin, 1863)
- Scopula subpunctaria (Herrich-Schäffer, 1847)
- Scopula ternata Schrank, 1802
- Scopula caricaria (Reutti, 1853)
- Scopula corrivalaria (Kretschmar, 1862)
- Scopula decorata (Denis & Schiffermüller, 1775)
- Scopula honestata (Mabille, 1869)
- Scopula immorata (Linnaeus, 1758)
- Scopula nemoraria (Hübner, 1799)
- Scopula nigropunctata (Hufnagel, 1767)
- Scopula ornata (Scopoli, 1763)
- Scopula rubiginata (Hufnagel, 1767)
- Scopula submutata (Treitschke, 1828)
- Scopula tessellaria (Boisduval, 1840)
- Scopula turbidaria (Hübner, 1819)
- Scopula umbelaria (Hübner, 1813)
- Scopula virgulata (Denis & Schiffermüller, 1775)
- Scotopteryx alfacaria (Staudinger, 1859)
- Scotopteryx angularia (de Villers, 1789)
- Scotopteryx bipunctaria (Denis & Schiffermüller, 1775)
- Scotopteryx chenopodiata (Linnaeus, 1758)
- Scotopteryx coarctaria (Denis & Schiffermüller, 1775)
- Scotopteryx coelinaria (de Graslin, 1863)
- Scotopteryx luridata (Hufnagel, 1767)
- Scotopteryx moeniata (Scopoli, 1763)
- Scotopteryx mucronata (Scopoli, 1763)
- Scotopteryx obvallaria (Mabille, 1867)
- Scotopteryx octodurensis (Favre, 1903)
- Scotopteryx peribolata (Hübner, 1817)
- Scotopteryx proximaria (Rambur, 1833)
- Scotopteryx vicinaria (Duponchel, 1830)
- Selenia dentaria (Fabricius, 1775)
- Selenia lunularia (Hübner, 1788)
- Selenia tetralunaria (Hufnagel, 1767)
- Selidosema brunnearia (de Villers, 1789)
- Selidosema taeniolaria (Hübner, 1813)
- Siona lineata (Scopoli, 1763)
- Solitanea mariae (Stauder, 1921)
- Spargania luctuata (Denis & Schiffermüller, 1775)
- Stegania cararia (Hübner, 1790)
- Stegania trimaculata (de Villers, 1789)
- Synopsia sociaria (Hübner, 1799)
- Tephronia codetaria (Oberthur, 1881)
- Tephronia cyrnea (Schawerda, 1932)
- Tephronia oranaria Staudinger, 1892
- Tephronia sepiaria (Hufnagel, 1767)
- Thalera fimbrialis (Scopoli, 1763)
- Thera britannica (Turner, 1925)
- Thera cognata (Thunberg, 1792)
- Thera cupressata (Geyer, 1831)
- Thera juniperata (Linnaeus, 1758)
- Thera obeliscata (Hübner, 1787)
- Thera variata (Denis & Schiffermüller, 1775)
- Thera vetustata (Denis & Schiffermüller, 1775)
- Theria primaria (Haworth, 1809)
- Theria rupicapraria (Denis & Schiffermüller, 1775)
- Thetidia smaragdaria (Fabricius, 1787)
- Thetidia plusiaria Boisduval, 1840
- Timandra comae Schmidt, 1931
- Trichopteryx carpinata (Borkhausen, 1794)
- Trichopteryx polycommata (Denis & Schiffermüller, 1775)
- Triphosa dubitata (Linnaeus, 1758)
- Triphosa sabaudiata (Duponchel, 1830)
- Triphosa tauteli Leraut, 2008
- Venusia blomeri (Curtis, 1832)
- Venusia cambrica Curtis, 1839
- Xanthorhoe biriviata (Borkhausen, 1794)
- Xanthorhoe decoloraria (Esper, 1806)
- Xanthorhoe designata (Hufnagel, 1767)
- Xanthorhoe ferrugata (Clerck, 1759)
- Xanthorhoe fluctuata (Linnaeus, 1758)
- Xanthorhoe incursata (Hübner, 1813)
- Xanthorhoe montanata (Denis & Schiffermüller, 1775)
- Xanthorhoe oxybiata (Milliere, 1872)
- Xanthorhoe quadrifasiata (Clerck, 1759)
- Xanthorhoe spadicearia (Denis & Schiffermüller, 1775)
- Xenochlorodes olympiaria (Herrich-Schäffer, 1852)

== Family Glyphipterigidae ==
- Acrolepia autumnitella Curtis, 1838
- Acrolepiopsis assectella (Zeller, 1839)
- Acrolepiopsis marcidella (Curtis, 1850)
- Acrolepiopsis vesperella (Zeller, 1850)
- Digitivalva arnicella (Heyden, 1863)
- Digitivalva eglanteriella (Mann, 1855)
- Digitivalva perlepidella (Stainton, 1849)
- Digitivalva valeriella (Snellen, 1878)
- Digitivalva granitella (Treitschke, 1833)
- Digitivalva occidentella (Klimesch, 1956)
- Digitivalva pulicariae (Klimesch, 1956)
- Digitivalva solidaginis (Staudinger, 1859)
- Glyphipterix argyroguttella Ragonot, 1885
- Glyphipterix bergstraesserella (Fabricius, 1781)
- Glyphipterix equitella (Scopoli, 1763)
- Glyphipterix forsterella (Fabricius, 1781)
- Glyphipterix fuscoviridella (Haworth, 1828)
- Glyphipterix gianelliella Ragonot, 1885
- Glyphipterix haworthana (Stephens, 1834)
- Glyphipterix heptaglyphella Le Marchand, 1925
- Glyphipterix nicaeella Moschler, 1866
- Glyphipterix schoenicolella Boyd, 1859
- Glyphipterix simpliciella (Stephens, 1834)
- Glyphipterix thrasonella (Scopoli, 1763)
- Orthotelia sparganella (Thunberg, 1788)

== Family Gracillariidae ==
- Acrocercops brongniardella (Fabricius, 1798)
- Acrocercops cocciferellum (Chretien, 1910)
- Aspilapteryx limosella (Duponchel, 1843)
- Aspilapteryx tringipennella (Zeller, 1839)
- Callisto coffeella (Zetterstedt, 1839)
- Callisto denticulella (Thunberg, 1794)
- Callisto pfaffenzelleri (Frey, 1856)
- Caloptilia alchimiella (Scopoli, 1763)
- Caloptilia azaleella (Brants, 1913)
- Caloptilia betulicola (M. Hering, 1928)
- Caloptilia coruscans (Walsingham, 1907)
- Caloptilia cuculipennella (Hübner, 1796)
- Caloptilia elongella (Linnaeus, 1761)
- Caloptilia falconipennella (Hübner, 1813)
- Caloptilia fidella (Reutti, 1853)
- Caloptilia fribergensis (Fritzsche, 1871)
- Caloptilia hauderi (Rebel, 1906)
- Caloptilia hemidactylella (Denis & Schiffermüller, 1775)
- Caloptilia populetorum (Zeller, 1839)
- Caloptilia robustella Jackh, 1972
- Caloptilia roscipennella (Hübner, 1796)
- Caloptilia rufipennella (Hübner, 1796)
- Caloptilia semifascia (Haworth, 1828)
- Caloptilia stigmatella (Fabricius, 1781)
- Calybites phasianipennella (Hübner, 1813)
- Cameraria ohridella Deschka & Dimic, 1986
- Dialectica imperialella (Zeller, 1847)
- Dialectica scalariella (Zeller, 1850)
- Euspilapteryx auroguttella Stephens, 1835
- Gracillaria loriolella Frey, 1881
- Gracillaria syringella (Fabricius, 1794)
- Leucospilapteryx omissella (Stainton, 1848)
- Macarostola miniella (Felder & Rogenhofer, 1875)
- Mercantouria neli Huemer, Lopez-Vaamonde & Triberti, 2016
- Metriochroa latifoliella (Milliere, 1886)
- Micrurapteryx kollariella (Zeller, 1839)
- Ornixola caudulatella (Zeller, 1839)
- Parectopa ononidis (Zeller, 1839)
- Parectopa robiniella Clemens, 1863
- Parornix alpicola (Wocke, 1877)
- Parornix ampliatella (Stainton, 1850)
- Parornix anglicella (Stainton, 1850)
- Parornix betulae (Stainton, 1854)
- Parornix carpinella (Frey, 1863)
- Parornix devoniella (Stainton, 1850)
- Parornix fagivora (Frey, 1861)
- Parornix finitimella (Zeller, 1850)
- Parornix petiolella (Frey, 1863)
- Parornix polygrammella (Wocke, 1862)
- Parornix scoticella (Stainton, 1850)
- Parornix torquillella (Zeller, 1850)
- Phyllocnistis labyrinthella (Bjerkander, 1790)
- Phyllocnistis saligna (Zeller, 1839)
- Phyllocnistis unipunctella (Stephens, 1834)
- Phyllocnistis xenia M. Hering, 1936
- Phyllonorycter abrasella (Duponchel, 1843)
- Phyllonorycter acaciella (Duponchel, 1843)
- Phyllonorycter acerifoliella (Zeller, 1839)
- Phyllonorycter agilella (Zeller, 1846)
- Phyllonorycter alnivorella (Ragonot, 1875)
- Phyllonorycter alpina (Frey, 1856)
- Phyllonorycter anceps Triberti, 2007
- Phyllonorycter apparella (Herrich-Schäffer, 1855)
- Phyllonorycter barbarella (Rebel, 1901)
- Phyllonorycter belotella (Staudinger, 1859)
- Phyllonorycter blancardella (Fabricius, 1781)
- Phyllonorycter cavella (Zeller, 1846)
- Phyllonorycter cephalariae (Lhomme, 1934)
- Phyllonorycter cerasicolella (Herrich-Schäffer, 1855)
- Phyllonorycter cerasinella (Reutti, 1852)
- Phyllonorycter cerisolella (Peyerimhoff, 1872)
- Phyllonorycter chrysella (Constant, 1885)
- Phyllonorycter cocciferella (Mendes, 1910)
- Phyllonorycter comparella (Duponchel, 1843)
- Phyllonorycter connexella (Zeller, 1846)
- Phyllonorycter coryli (Nicelli, 1851)
- Phyllonorycter corylifoliella (Hübner, 1796)
- Phyllonorycter delitella (Duponchel, 1843)
- Phyllonorycter distentella (Zeller, 1846)
- Phyllonorycter dubitella (Herrich-Schäffer, 1855)
- Phyllonorycter emberizaepenella (Bouche, 1834)
- Phyllonorycter endryella (Mann, 1855)
- Phyllonorycter esperella (Goeze, 1783)
- Phyllonorycter fraxinella (Zeller, 1846)
- Phyllonorycter froelichiella (Zeller, 1839)
- Phyllonorycter geniculella (Ragonot, 1874)
- Phyllonorycter haasi (Rebel, 1901)
- Phyllonorycter harrisella (Linnaeus, 1761)
- Phyllonorycter heegeriella (Zeller, 1846)
- Phyllonorycter helianthemella (Herrich-Schäffer, 1861)
- Phyllonorycter hilarella (Zetterstedt, 1839)
- Phyllonorycter ilicifoliella (Duponchel, 1843)
- Phyllonorycter insignitella (Zeller, 1846)
- Phyllonorycter joannisi (Le Marchand, 1936)
- Phyllonorycter junoniella (Zeller, 1846)
- Phyllonorycter klemannella (Fabricius, 1781)
- Phyllonorycter kuhlweiniella (Zeller, 1839)
- Phyllonorycter kusdasi Deschka, 1970
- Phyllonorycter lantanella (Schrank, 1802)
- Phyllonorycter lapadiella (Krone, 1909)
- Phyllonorycter lautella (Zeller, 1846)
- Phyllonorycter leucographella (Zeller, 1850)
- Phyllonorycter maestingella (Muller, 1764)
- Phyllonorycter mannii (Zeller, 1846)
- Phyllonorycter mespilella (Hübner, 1805)
- Phyllonorycter messaniella (Zeller, 1846)
- Phyllonorycter millierella (Staudinger, 1871)
- Phyllonorycter monspessulanella (Fuchs, 1897)
- Phyllonorycter muelleriella (Zeller, 1839)
- Phyllonorycter nicellii (Stainton, 1851)
- Phyllonorycter nigrescentella (Logan, 1851)
- Phyllonorycter oxyacanthae (Frey, 1856)
- Phyllonorycter parisiella (Wocke, 1848)
- Phyllonorycter parvifoliella (Ragonot, 1875)
- Phyllonorycter pastorella (Zeller, 1846)
- Phyllonorycter phyllocytisi (M. Hering, 1936)
- Phyllonorycter platani (Staudinger, 1870)
- Phyllonorycter populifoliella (Treitschke, 1833)
- Phyllonorycter pseudoplataniella (Ragonot, 1874)
- Phyllonorycter purgantella (Chretien, 1915)
- Phyllonorycter quercifoliella (Zeller, 1839)
- Phyllonorycter quinqueguttella (Stainton, 1851)
- Phyllonorycter rajella (Linnaeus, 1758)
- Phyllonorycter rebimbasi (Mendes, 1910)
- Phyllonorycter robiniella (Clemens, 1859)
- Phyllonorycter roboris (Zeller, 1839)
- Phyllonorycter sagitella (Bjerkander, 1790)
- Phyllonorycter salicicolella (Sircom, 1848)
- Phyllonorycter salictella (Zeller, 1846)
- Phyllonorycter scabiosella (Douglas, 1853)
- Phyllonorycter schreberella (Fabricius, 1781)
- Phyllonorycter scitulella (Duponchel, 1843)
- Phyllonorycter scopariella (Zeller, 1846)
- Phyllonorycter sorbi (Frey, 1855)
- Phyllonorycter spinicolella (Zeller, 1846)
- Phyllonorycter staintoniella (Nicelli, 1853)
- Phyllonorycter stettinensis (Nicelli, 1852)
- Phyllonorycter strigulatella (Lienig & Zeller, 1846)
- Phyllonorycter suaveolentis (Petry, 1904)
- Phyllonorycter suberifoliella (Zeller, 1850)
- Phyllonorycter sublautella (Stainton, 1869)
- Phyllonorycter tenerella (de Joannis, 1915)
- Phyllonorycter trifasciella (Haworth, 1828)
- Phyllonorycter triflorella (Peyerimhoff, 1872)
- Phyllonorycter tristrigella (Haworth, 1828)
- Phyllonorycter ulicicolella (Stainton, 1851)
- Phyllonorycter ulmifoliella (Hübner, 1817)
- Phyllonorycter viminetorum (Stainton, 1854)
- Phyllonorycter vulturella (Deschka, 1968)
- Povolnya leucapennella (Stephens, 1835)
- Sauterina hofmanniella (Schleich, 1867)
- Spulerina simploniella (Fischer von Röslerstamm, 1840)

== Family Heliodinidae ==
- Heliodines roesella (Linnaeus, 1758)

== Family Heliozelidae ==
- Antispila metallella (Denis & Schiffermüller, 1775)
- Antispila treitschkiella (Fischer von Röslerstamm, 1843)
- Heliozela hammoniella Sorhagen, 1885
- Heliozela lithargyrellum (Zeller, 1850)
- Heliozela resplendella (Stainton, 1851)
- Heliozela sericiella (Haworth, 1828)
- Holocacista rivillei (Stainton, 1855)

== Family Hepialidae ==
- Gazoryctra ganna (Hübner, 1808)
- Hepialus humuli (Linnaeus, 1758)
- Pharmacis bertrandi (Le Cerf, 1936)
- Pharmacis carna (Denis & Schiffermüller, 1775)
- Pharmacis fusconebulosa (DeGeer, 1778)
- Pharmacis lupulina (Linnaeus, 1758)
- Pharmacis pyrenaicus (Donzel, 1838)
- Phymatopus hecta (Linnaeus, 1758)
- Triodia sylvina (Linnaeus, 1761)

== Family Heterogynidae ==
- Heterogynis canalensis Chapman, 1904
- Heterogynis penella (Hübner, 1819)
- Heterogynis pravieli Leraut, 2006
- Heterogynis valdeblorensis Leraut, 2006
