= Scopula rubellata =

Scientific classification
- Domain: Eukaryota
- Kingdom: Animalia
- Phylum: Arthropoda
- Class: Insecta
- Order: Lepidoptera
- Family: Geometridae
- Genus: Scopula
- Species: S. rubellata

Binomial name
- Scopula rubellata (Staudinger, 1871)

Synonyms
- Acidalia rubellata Staudinger, 1871; Acidalia rubellaria Boisduval, 1840

Species of geometer moth in subfamily Sterrhinae

Scopula rubellata is a moth of the family Geometridae. It was described by Staudinger in 1871. It is found in France, Spain and Portugal.

The wingspan is about 21 to 22 millimetres (0.83 to 0.87 in).
