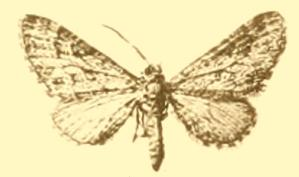

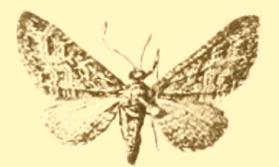

Scientific classification
- Kingdom: Animalia
- Phylum: Arthropoda
- Clade: Pancrustacea
- Class: Insecta
- Order: Lepidoptera
- Family: Geometridae
- Genus: Eupithecia
- Species: E. cooptata

Binomial name
- Eupithecia cooptata Dietze, 1903

= Eupithecia cooptata =

Species of moth

Eupithecia cooptata is a moth in the family Geometridae. It is found in France and Spain.

The length of the forewings is 10.5–11.5 mm.

The larvae feed on Artemisia camphorata.
