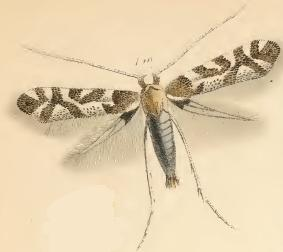

Scientific classification
- Domain: Eukaryota
- Kingdom: Animalia
- Phylum: Arthropoda
- Class: Insecta
- Order: Lepidoptera
- Family: Gracillariidae
- Genus: Phyllonorycter
- Species: P. comparella

Binomial name
- Phyllonorycter comparella (Duponchel, 1843)

Synonyms
- Elachista comparella Duponchel, 1843; Lithocolletis cerrutiella Hartig, 1952

= Phyllonorycter comparella =

Species of moth

Phyllonorycter comparella is a moth of the family Gracillariidae. It is found from Germany and the Baltic States to Spain, Sardinia, Sicily, Hungary and Bulgaria and from Great Britain to central and southern Russia.

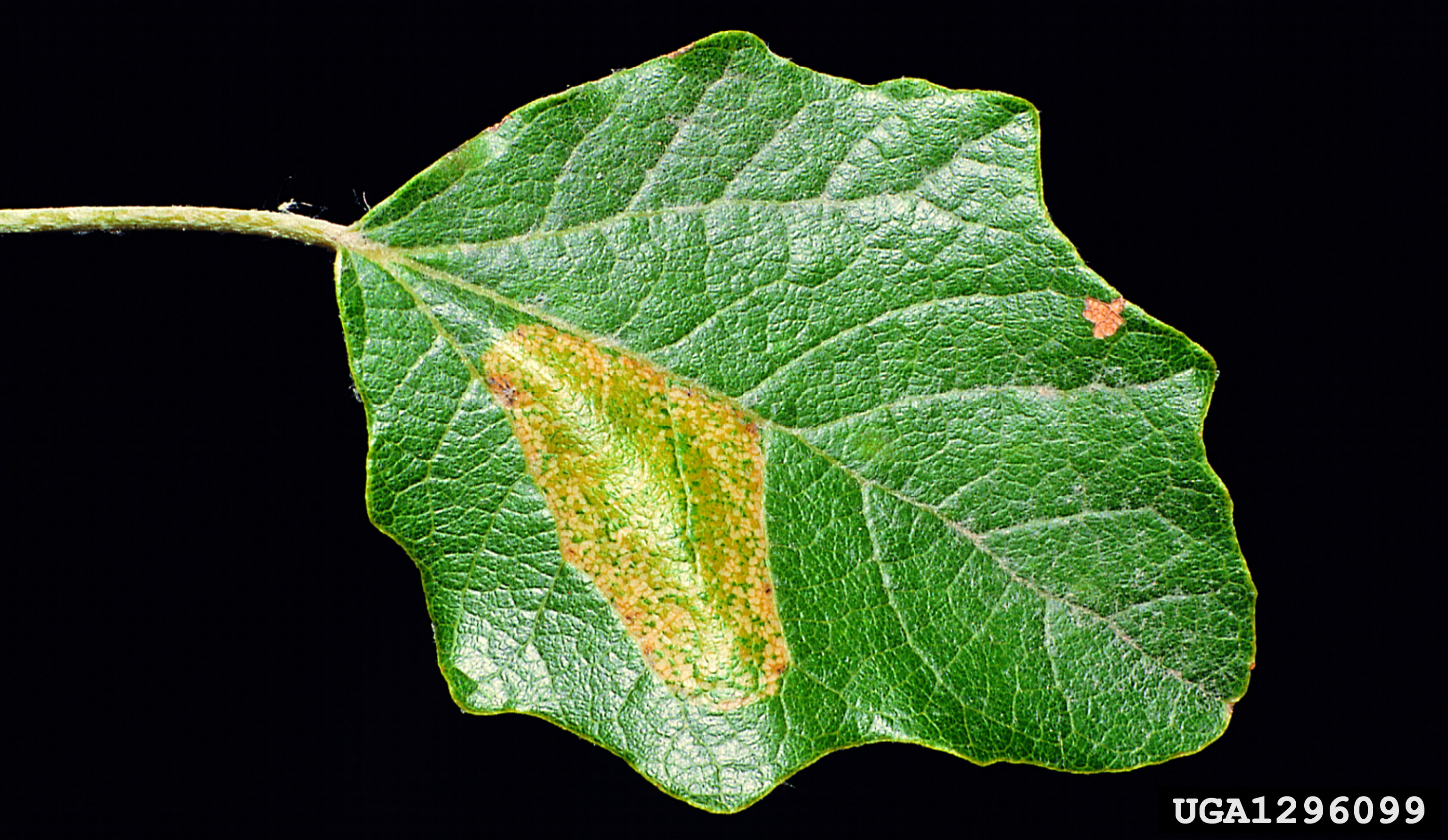
Damage

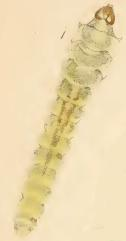
Larva

The wingspan is about 8 mm.

The larvae feed on Populus alba, Populus canescens and sometimes Populus nigra. They mine the leaves of their host plant.
