= Phyllonorycter pseudoplataniella =

Scientific classification
- Domain: Eukaryota
- Kingdom: Animalia
- Phylum: Arthropoda
- Class: Insecta
- Order: Lepidoptera
- Family: Gracillariidae
- Genus: Phyllonorycter
- Species: P. pseudoplataniella

Binomial name
- Phyllonorycter pseudoplataniella (Ragonot, 1874)

Synonyms
- Lithocolletis pseudoplataniella Ragonot, 1874

Species of moth

Phyllonorycter pseudoplataniella is a moth of the family Gracillariidae. It is known from France and Germany.

The larvae feed on Acer pseudoplatanus. They mine the leaves of their host plant.
