= Scrobipalpa camphorosmella =

Scientific classification
- Domain: Eukaryota
- Kingdom: Animalia
- Phylum: Arthropoda
- Class: Insecta
- Order: Lepidoptera
- Family: Gelechiidae
- Genus: Scrobipalpa
- Species: S. camphorosmella

Binomial name
- Scrobipalpa camphorosmella Nel, 1999

Species of moth

Scrobipalpa camphorosmella is a moth in the family Gelechiidae. It was described by Jacques Nel in 1999. It is found in southern France and Spain.

The larvae feed on Camphorosma monspeliaca.
