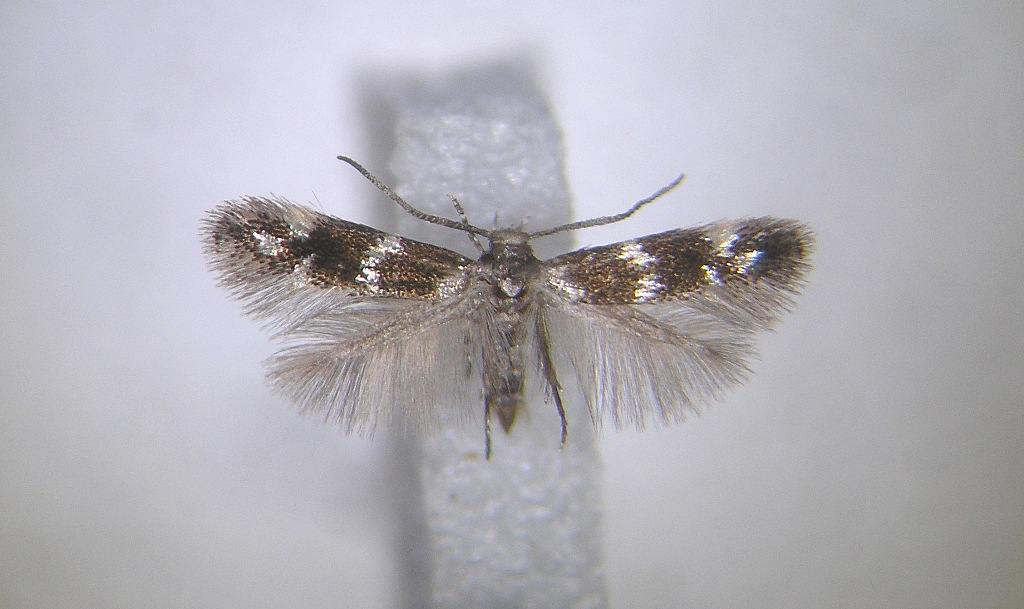

Scientific classification
- Domain: Eukaryota
- Kingdom: Animalia
- Phylum: Arthropoda
- Class: Insecta
- Order: Lepidoptera
- Family: Elachistidae
- Genus: Elachista
- Species: E. nobilella

Binomial name
- Elachista nobilella Zeller, 1839

= Elachista nobilella =

Species of moth

Elachista nobilella is a moth of the family Elachistidae found in Europe.

== Description ==
The wingspan is 6–8 millimetres (0.24–0.31 in). Adults are on wing from May to July.

The larvae feed on grasses, including Agrostis, Arrhenatherum, Bromus, Carex, Dactylis, Festuca, Yorkshire fog (Holcus lanatus) and hairy wood-rush (Luzula pilosa).

== Distribution ==
It is found from Scandinavia and Finland to the Iberian Peninsula and Italy and from France to Romania.
