= Phyllonorycter suaveolentis =

Scientific classification
- Domain: Eukaryota
- Kingdom: Animalia
- Phylum: Arthropoda
- Class: Insecta
- Order: Lepidoptera
- Family: Gracillariidae
- Genus: Phyllonorycter
- Species: P. suaveolentis

Binomial name
- Phyllonorycter suaveolentis (Petry, 1904)

Synonyms
- Lithocolletis suaveolentis Petry, 1904

Species of moth

Phyllonorycter suaveolentis is a moth of the family Gracillariidae. It is found in the mountains of Corsica.

The larvae feed on Alnus viridis suaveolens. They mine the leaves of their host plant.
