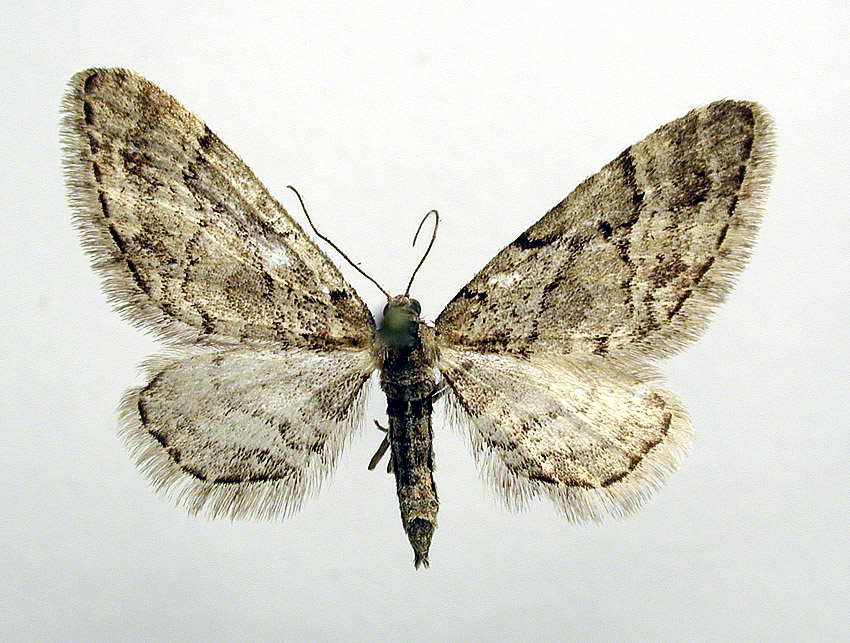

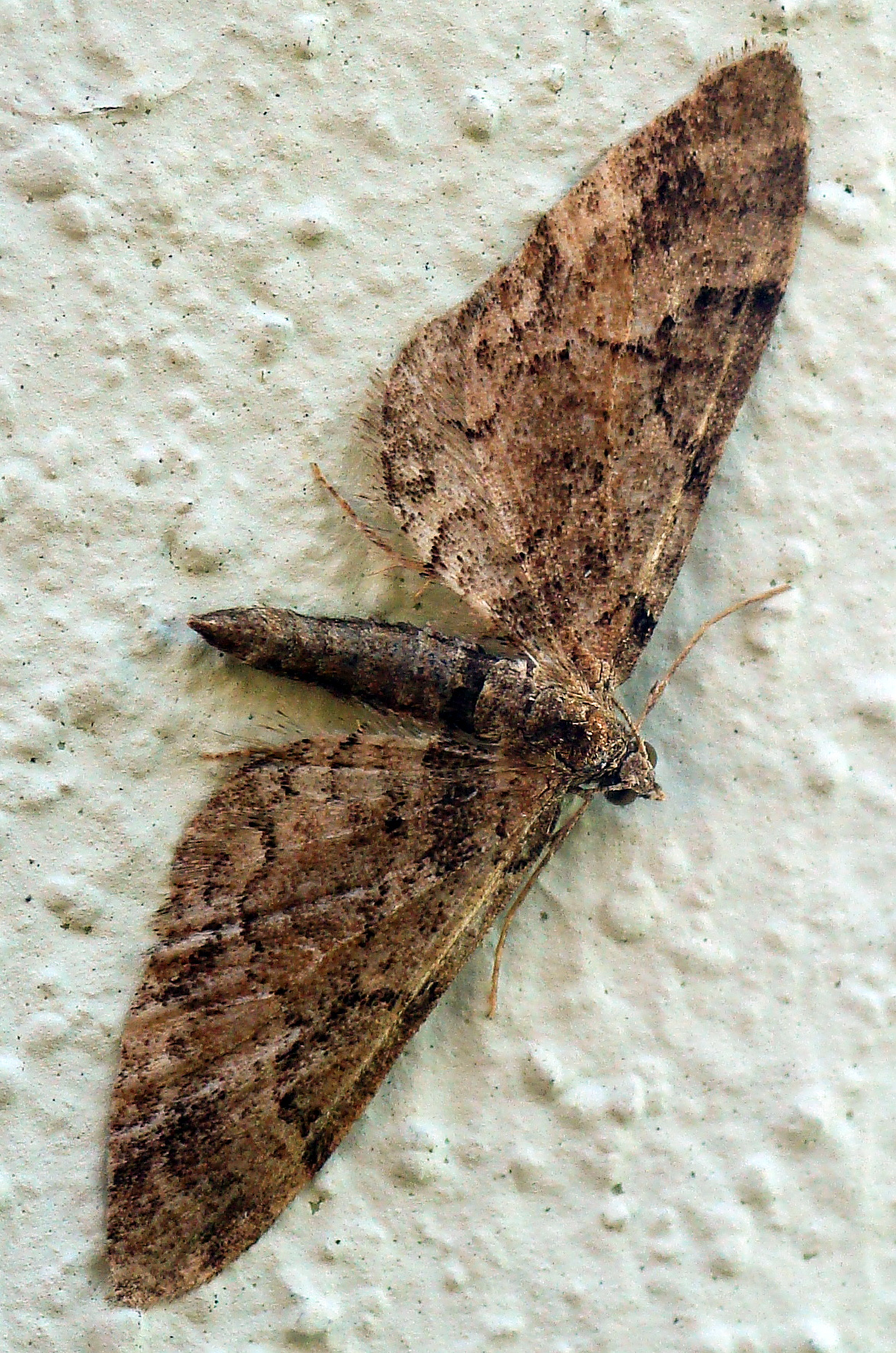

Scientific classification
- Domain: Eukaryota
- Kingdom: Animalia
- Phylum: Arthropoda
- Class: Insecta
- Order: Lepidoptera
- Family: Geometridae
- Genus: Eupithecia
- Species: E. lanceata

Binomial name
- Eupithecia lanceata (Hübner, 1825)

Synonyms
- Dyscymatoge lanceata Hübner, 1825; Larentia hospitata Treitschke, 1828

= Eupithecia lanceata =

Species of moth

Eupithecia lanceata is a moth of the family Geometridae. It is known from most of the Palearctic realm, except for the south. The habitat consists of pine forests.

The wingspan is 16–20 mm. There is one generation per year with adults on wing from April to May.

The larvae feed on Picea abies, Juniperus communis and Larix decidua. Larvae can be found in June. It overwinters as a pupa.
