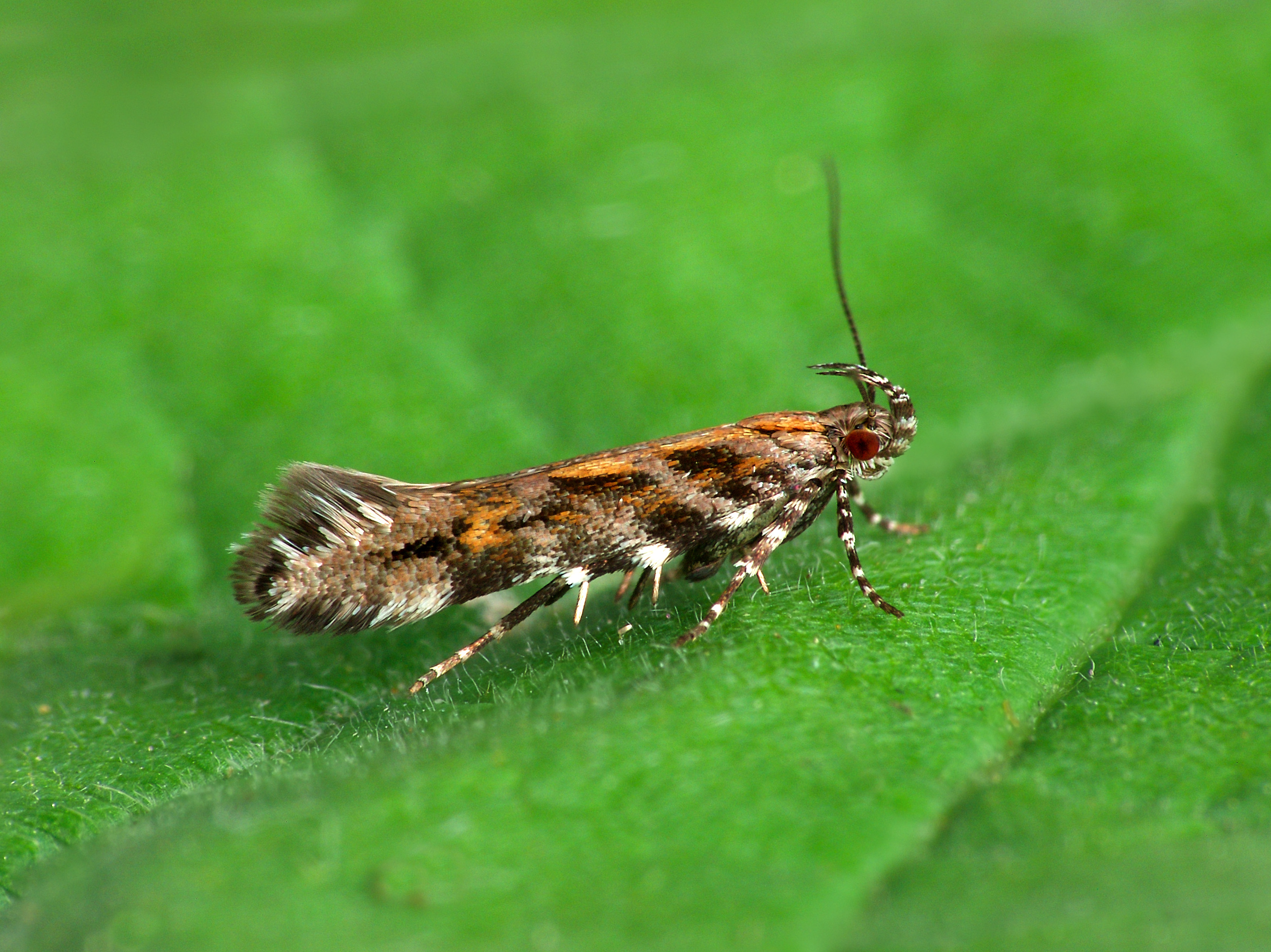

Scientific classification
- Kingdom: Animalia
- Phylum: Arthropoda
- Clade: Pancrustacea
- Class: Insecta
- Order: Lepidoptera
- Family: Gelechiidae
- Genus: Aristotelia
- Species: A. ericinella

Binomial name
- Aristotelia ericinella (Zeller, 1839)

Synonyms
- Gelechia ericinella Zeller, 1839; Aristotelia ericinella ab. silendrella Caradja, 1920; Xystophora sardicolella Schawerda, 1936; Aristotelia sardicolella

= Aristotelia ericinella =

Species of moth

Aristotelia ericinella is a moth of the family Gelechiidae. It is found in most of Europe, except most of the Balkan Peninsula.

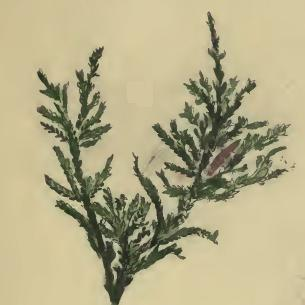
A sprig of Calluna bearing a web formed by larva

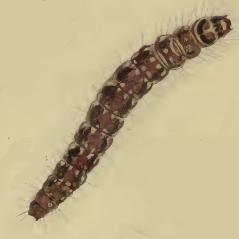
Larva

The wingspan is 9–13 mm. The forewings are dark fuscous with a dorsal streak to beyond middle, and sometimes a posterior spot in disc both reddish ochreous. There is a spot on dorsum at base, an oblique fascia at 1/4, a costally furcate fascia in middle, a tornal spot, a costal spot beyond it, and some terminal dots all rosy silvery; stigmata sometimes obscurely blackish. The hindwings are grey. The larva is ochreous-brown, rosy-tinged; subdorsal line dark brown, partly edged with pale yellowish; spiracular pale yellowish, slender; head and front of 2 pale brown.

Adults are on wing from July to August.

The larvae feed on Calluna species and Empetrum nigrum. Larvae can be found from September to June.
