= Phyllonorycter haasi =

Scientific classification
- Domain: Eukaryota
- Kingdom: Animalia
- Phylum: Arthropoda
- Class: Insecta
- Order: Lepidoptera
- Family: Gracillariidae
- Genus: Phyllonorycter
- Species: P. haasi

Binomial name
- Phyllonorycter haasi (Rebel, 1901)

Synonyms
- Lithocolletis haasi Rebel, 1901

Species of moth

Phyllonorycter haasi is a moth of the family Gracillariidae. It is known from France, Portugal, and Spain. The larvae feed on Cytisus balansae.
