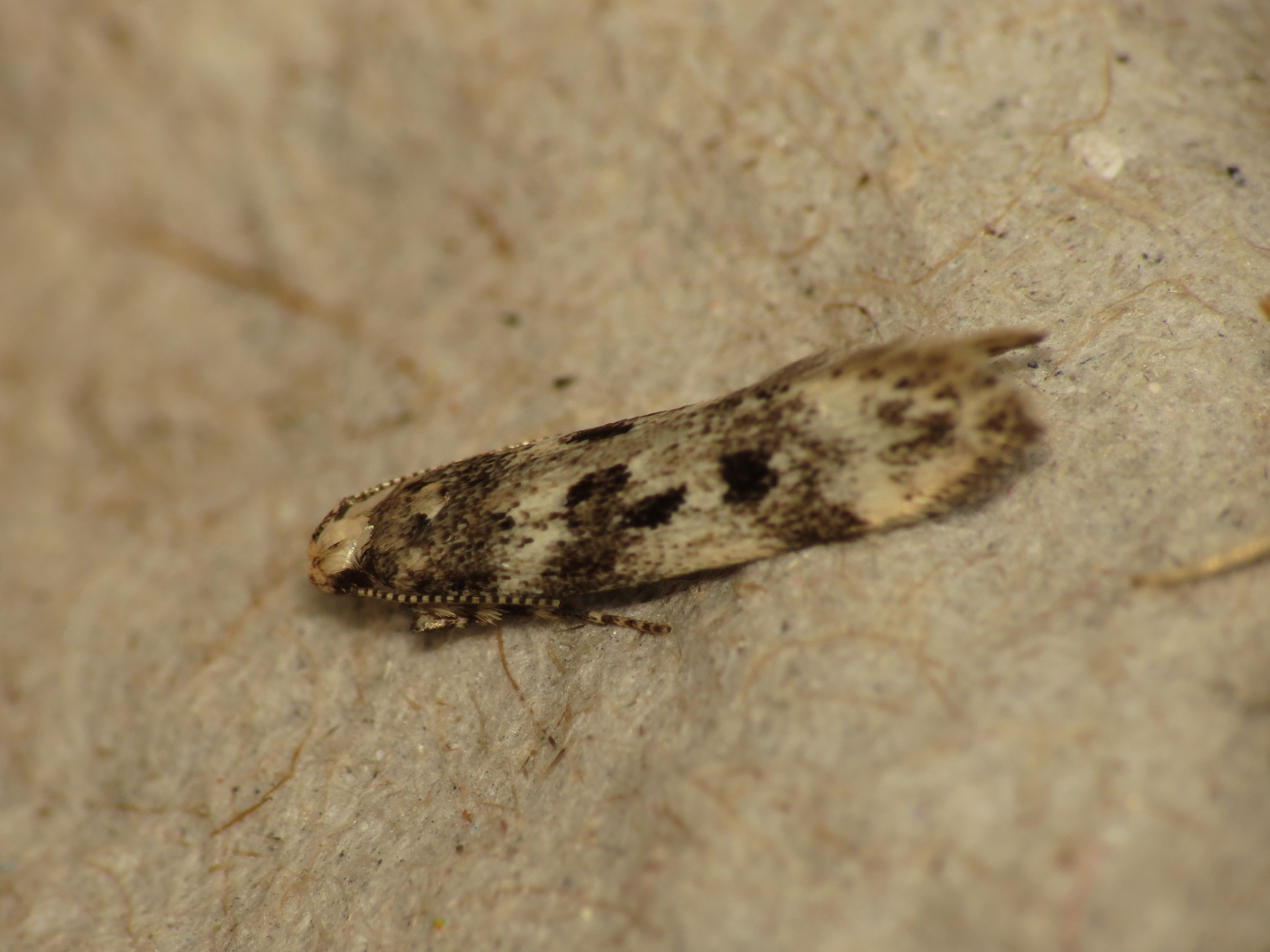

Scientific classification
- Kingdom: Animalia
- Phylum: Arthropoda
- Clade: Pancrustacea
- Class: Insecta
- Order: Lepidoptera
- Family: Gelechiidae
- Genus: Chionodes
- Species: C. electella

Binomial name
- Chionodes electella (Zeller, 1839)

Synonyms
- Gelechia electella Zeller, 1839

= Chionodes electella =

Species of moth

Chionodes electella is a moth of the family Gelechiidae. It is found in almost all of Europe (except Ireland, Great Britain and the Balkan Peninsula). In the east, the range extends to the southern Ural.

The wingspan is 12–16 mm. Adults have been recorded on wing from May to July.
