= Phyllonorycter cocciferella =

Scientific classification
- Domain: Eukaryota
- Kingdom: Animalia
- Phylum: Arthropoda
- Class: Insecta
- Order: Lepidoptera
- Family: Gracillariidae
- Genus: Phyllonorycter
- Species: P. cocciferella

Binomial name
- Phyllonorycter cocciferella (Mendes, 1910)

Synonyms
- Lithocolletis cocciferella Mendes, 1910; Coriscium cocciferellum

Species of moth

Phyllonorycter cocciferella is a moth of the family Gracillariidae. It is known from southern France and the Iberian Peninsula.

The larvae feed on Quercus coccifera. They mine the leaves of their host plant. They create a lower-surface tentiform mine.
