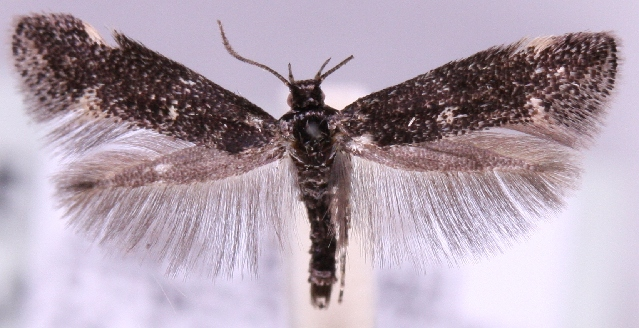

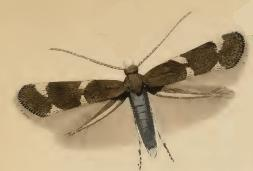

Scientific classification
- Kingdom: Animalia
- Phylum: Arthropoda
- Clade: Pancrustacea
- Class: Insecta
- Order: Lepidoptera
- Family: Elachistidae
- Genus: Elachista
- Species: E. atricomella

Binomial name
- Elachista atricomella Stainton, 1849

Synonyms
- List: Elachista holdenella Stainton, 1854; Microsetia exiguella Fabricius sensu Stephens, 1834; Elachista alienella Stainton, 1851; Elachista extensella Stainton, 1851; Elachista zetterstedtii Wallgreen, 1852; Elachista helvetica Frey, 1856; Elachista longipennis Frey, 1885

= Elachista atricomella =

Species of moth

Elachista atricomella is a moth of the family Elachistidae that is found in Europe.

== Description ==
The wingspan is about 12 millimetres (0.47 in). The head is blackish, whitish sprinkled, face in female whitish. Male forewings have an interrupted, rather oblique fascia before the middle, a tornal spot, and a bigger triangular mark beyond it on the white costa. Hindwings are dark grey. The larva is pale yellowish; head pale brown; 2 with two yellow brown marks.

The moth flies from May to September depending on the location.

The larvae mines the leaves of cock's-foot (Dactylis glomerata). Larvae regularly vacate the mine and begin elsewhere. Pupation takes place outside of the mine. Larvae can be found from late autumn to May. They are greenish yellow with a light brown head.

== Distribution ==
The moth is found in most of Europe, except the Iberian Peninsula, Balkan Peninsula and the Mediterranean Islands.
