= Acrocercops cocciferellum =

Scientific classification
- Domain: Eukaryota
- Kingdom: Animalia
- Phylum: Arthropoda
- Class: Insecta
- Order: Lepidoptera
- Family: Gracillariidae
- Genus: Acrocercops
- Species: A. cocciferellum

Binomial name
- Acrocercops cocciferellum (Chrétien, 1910)

Synonyms
- Coriscium cocciferellum Chrétien, 1910

Species of moth

Acrocercops cocciferellum is a moth of the family Gracillariidae. It is known from France, Spain and Tunisia.

The larvae feed on Quercus coccifera. They mine the leaves of their host plant.
