= Glyphipterix nicaeella =

Scientific classification
- Kingdom: Animalia
- Phylum: Arthropoda
- Clade: Pancrustacea
- Class: Insecta
- Order: Lepidoptera
- Family: Glyphipterigidae
- Genus: Glyphipterix
- Species: G. nicaeella

Binomial name
- Glyphipterix nicaeella Moschler, 1866

Synonyms
- Glyphitpryx altiorella Weber, 1946 (nec Bauer)

Species of moth

Glyphipterix nicaeella is a moth of the family Glyphipterigidae. It is found in France and Switzerland.

The wingspan is about 11 mm.
