= Phyllonorycter alnivorella =

Scientific classification
- Domain: Eukaryota
- Kingdom: Animalia
- Phylum: Arthropoda
- Class: Insecta
- Order: Lepidoptera
- Family: Gracillariidae
- Genus: Phyllonorycter
- Species: P. alnivorella

Binomial name
- Phyllonorycter alnivorella (Ragonot, 1875)

Synonyms
- Lithocolletis alnivorella Ragonot, 1875

Species of moth

Phyllonorycter alnivorella is a moth of the family Gracillariidae. It is found in France and Portugal.

The larvae feed on Alnus glutinosa. They mine the leaves of their host plant.
