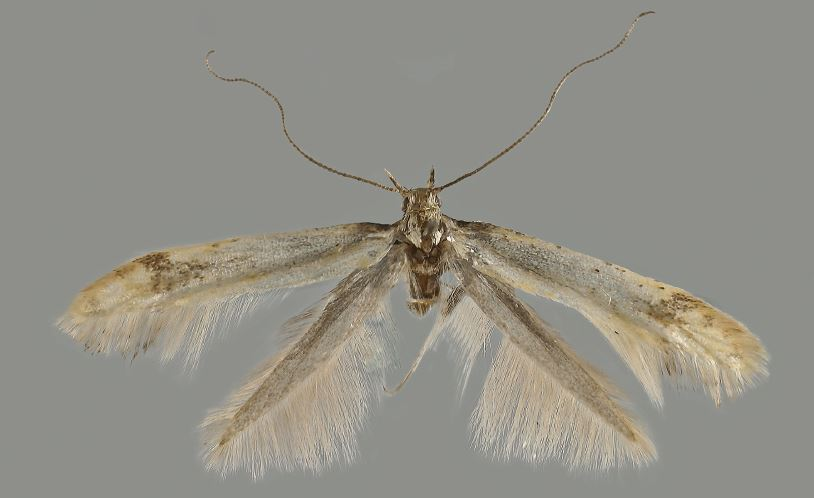

Scientific classification
- Kingdom: Animalia
- Phylum: Arthropoda
- Clade: Pancrustacea
- Class: Insecta
- Order: Lepidoptera
- Family: Gracillariidae
- Subfamily: Gracillariinae
- Genus: Mercantouria; Huemer, Lopez-Vaamonde & Triberti, 2016
- Species: M. neli

Binomial name
- Mercantouria neli Huemer, Lopez-Vaamonde & Triberti, 2016

= Mercantouria =

Genus of moths

Mercantouria is a genus of moths in the family Gracillariidae. It contains only one species, Mercantouria neli, which is known only from a small area of the French Hautes-Alpes and Alpes-Maritimes. The habitat is dominated by subalpine scree and grassland on limestone soil at altitudes ranging from about 1,750 to 2,100 metres above sea level.

The length of the forewings is 5.1–5.8 mm. The forewings are pale ochre yellow with small spots or suffusion of dark brown, mostly along the discoidal cell and sometimes forming, in the apical third of the wing, an irregular fascia. The hindwings are light ochre-greyish. Adults have been recorded on wing from mid- to late July.

== Etymology ==
The generic name refers to the region of Mercantour National Park and the species name honours Dr. Jacques Nel (La Ciotat, France) who independently recognized and collected the species.
