= Phyllonorycter chrysella =

Scientific classification
- Domain: Eukaryota
- Kingdom: Animalia
- Phylum: Arthropoda
- Class: Insecta
- Order: Lepidoptera
- Family: Gracillariidae
- Genus: Phyllonorycter
- Species: P. chrysella

Binomial name
- Phyllonorycter chrysella (Constant, 1885)

Synonyms
- Lithocolletis chrysella Constant, 1885

Species of moth

Phyllonorycter chrysella is a moth of the family Gracillariidae. It is known from southern France, Spain and Italy.

The larvae feed on Alnus glutinosa and Alnus incana. They mine the leaves of their host plant.
