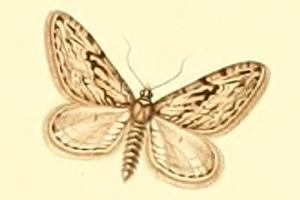

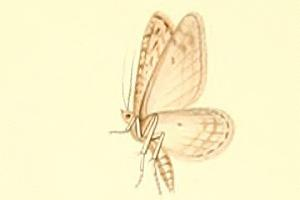

Scientific classification
- Domain: Eukaryota
- Kingdom: Animalia
- Phylum: Arthropoda
- Class: Insecta
- Order: Lepidoptera
- Family: Geometridae
- Genus: Eupithecia
- Species: E. rosmarinata

Binomial name
- Eupithecia rosmarinata Dardoin & Millière, 1865

= Eupithecia rosmarinata =

Species of moth

Eupithecia rosmarinata is a moth in the family Geometridae. It is found in France and Spain.

The larvae feed on Rosmarinus and Thymus species.

== Gallery ==
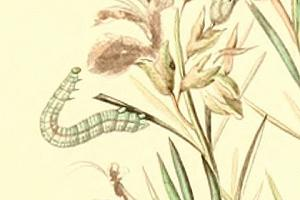
Larva

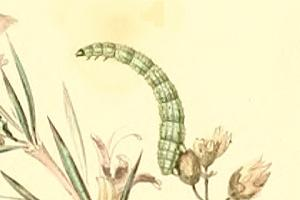
Larva

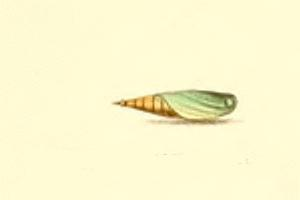
Pupa
