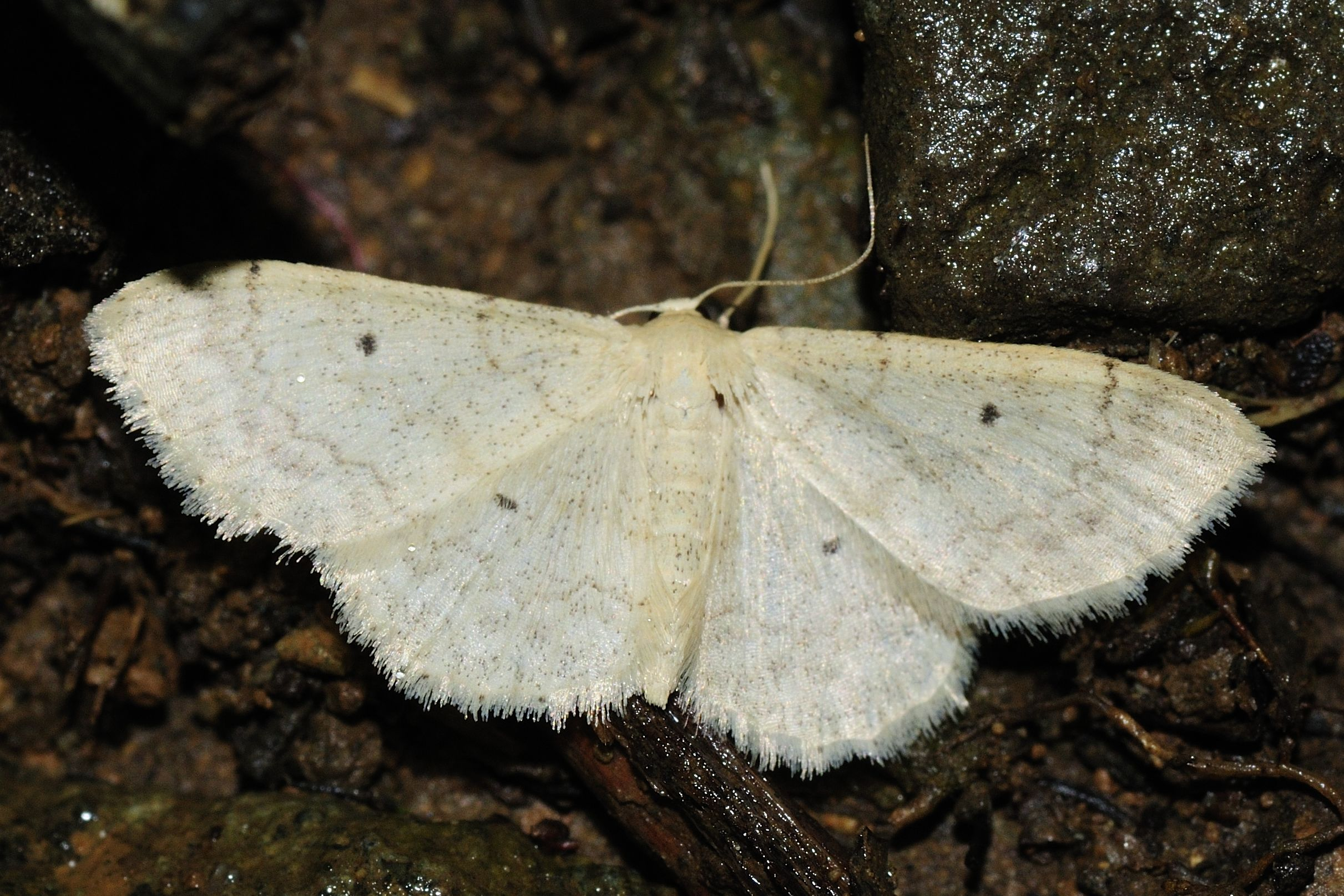

Scientific classification
- Kingdom: Animalia
- Phylum: Arthropoda
- Clade: Pancrustacea
- Class: Insecta
- Order: Lepidoptera
- Family: Geometridae
- Genus: Idaea
- Species: I. mancipiata

Binomial name
- Idaea mancipiata (Staudinger, 1871)

Synonyms
- Acidalia mancipiata Staudinger, 1871; Sterrha bustilloi Agenjo, 1967; Ptychopoda repagulata Prout, 1913

= Idaea mancipiata =

Species of moth

Idaea mancipiata is a moth of the family Geometridae. It is found in Europe und western Asia.

The wingspan is 15–20 mm for the first generation and 14–16 mm for the second generation. Adults are on wing from the beginning of May to the end of June and again from the beginning of August to the end of October. There are two generations per year.

== Subspecies ==
- Idaea manciapiata manciapiata (southern France, Spain)
- Idaea manciapiata repagulata (Prout, 1913) (Ukraine (Crimea) to the Ural and from northern Iran to the Caucasus)
