= Phyllonorycter purgantella =

Scientific classification
- Domain: Eukaryota
- Kingdom: Animalia
- Phylum: Arthropoda
- Class: Insecta
- Order: Lepidoptera
- Family: Gracillariidae
- Genus: Phyllonorycter
- Species: P. purgantella

Binomial name
- Phyllonorycter purgantella (Chretien, 1915)

Synonyms
- Lithocolletis purgantella Chretien, 1915

Species of moth

Phyllonorycter purgantella is a moth of the family Gracillariidae. It is known from southern France and Spain.

The larvae feed on Cytisus purgans. They mine the leaves of their host plant.
