= Eupithecia weissi =

Scientific classification
- Domain: Eukaryota
- Kingdom: Animalia
- Phylum: Arthropoda
- Class: Insecta
- Order: Lepidoptera
- Family: Geometridae
- Genus: Eupithecia
- Species: E. weissi

Binomial name
- Eupithecia weissi Prout, 1938

Synonyms
- Eupithecia pauxillaria weissi Prout, 1938; Eupithecia barbaria Schwingenschuss, 1955

Species of moth

Eupithecia weissi is a moth in the family Geometridae. It was described by Prout in 1938. It is found in France, Spain and North Africa.
