= Elachista anserinelloides =

Scientific classification
- Domain: Eukaryota
- Kingdom: Animalia
- Phylum: Arthropoda
- Class: Insecta
- Order: Lepidoptera
- Family: Elachistidae
- Genus: Elachista
- Species: E. anserinelloides

Binomial name
- Elachista anserinelloides Nel, 2003

Species of moth

Elachista anserinelloides is a moth of the family Elachistidae that is endemic to France.
