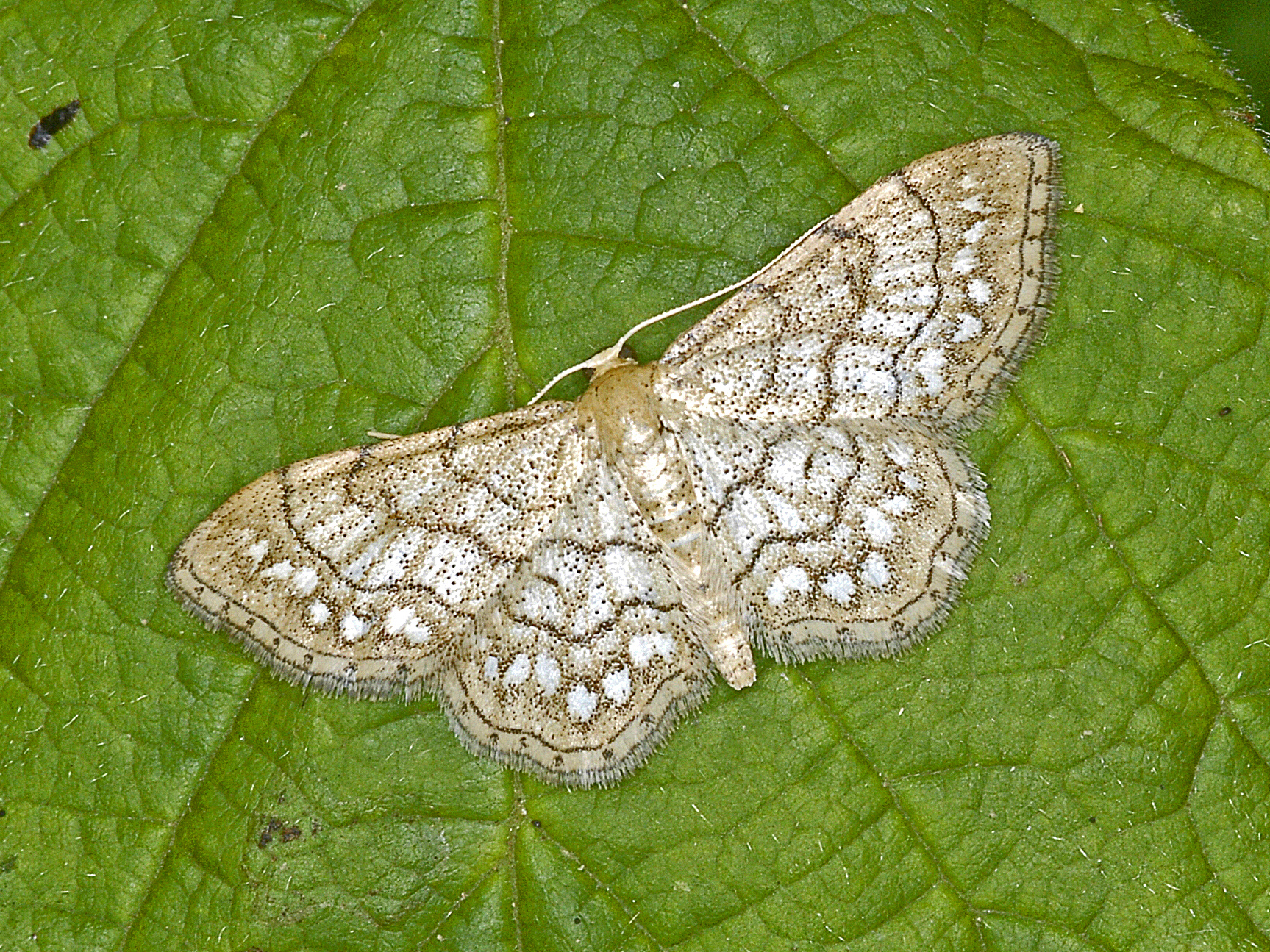

Scientific classification
- Kingdom: Animalia
- Phylum: Arthropoda
- Clade: Pancrustacea
- Class: Insecta
- Order: Lepidoptera
- Family: Geometridae
- Genus: Idaea
- Species: I. moniliata

Binomial name
- Idaea moniliata (Denis & Schiffermüller, 1775)

= Idaea moniliata =

Chequered wave

Species of moth

Idaea moniliata, common name chequered wave, is a moth of the family Geometridae.

== Description ==
Idaea moniliata has a wingspan of about 18–20 millimetres (0.71–0.79 in). The background color of the wings is whitish with light brown thin lines, a row of relatively large round white spots (hence the Latin name moniliata, meaning with collar or necklace) and tiny, dark dots on the edge. This univoltine species fly from late May to early August. The larva feeds on withered leaves of various low-growing herbaceous plants, especially Vetch (Vicia species), Hawkbit (Leontodon species) and Forget-me-not (Myosotis species).

== Distribution and habitat ==
This species can be found in most of Europe and the Near East. It mainly lives on limestone background and dry meadows.
