= Epermenia pumila =

Scientific classification
- Kingdom: Animalia
- Phylum: Arthropoda
- Clade: Pancrustacea
- Class: Insecta
- Order: Lepidoptera
- Family: Epermeniidae
- Genus: Epermenia
- Species: E. pumila

Binomial name
- Epermenia pumila (Buvat & Nel, 2000)

Synonyms
- Cataplectica pumila Buvat & Nel, 2000

Species of moth

Epermenia pumila is a moth of the family Epermeniidae. It is found in France.
