= Scrobipalpa halimioniella =

Scientific classification
- Kingdom: Animalia
- Phylum: Arthropoda
- Clade: Pancrustacea
- Class: Insecta
- Order: Lepidoptera
- Family: Gelechiidae
- Genus: Scrobipalpa
- Species: S. halimioniella

Binomial name
- Scrobipalpa halimioniella Huemer & Karsholt, 2010

Species of moth

Scrobipalpa halimioniella is a moth in the family Gelechiidae. It was described by Peter Huemer and Ole Karsholt in 2010. It is found southern France and has also been recorded from Ukraine.

The larvae feed on Halimione portulacoides.
