= Phyllonorycter barbarella =

Scientific classification
- Domain: Eukaryota
- Kingdom: Animalia
- Phylum: Arthropoda
- Class: Insecta
- Order: Lepidoptera
- Family: Gracillariidae
- Genus: Phyllonorycter
- Species: P. barbarella

Binomial name
- Phyllonorycter barbarella (Rebel, 1901)

Synonyms
- Lithocolletis barbarella Rebel, 1901; Phyllonorycter neli Buvat, 1996

Species of moth

Phyllonorycter barbarella is a moth of the family Gracillariidae. It is found from the Iberian Peninsula and southern France.

The larvae feed on Quercus faginea and Quercus pubescens. They mine the leaves of their host plant.
