= Phyllonorycter rebimbasi =

Scientific classification
- Domain: Eukaryota
- Kingdom: Animalia
- Phylum: Arthropoda
- Class: Insecta
- Order: Lepidoptera
- Family: Gracillariidae
- Genus: Phyllonorycter
- Species: P. rebimbasi

Binomial name
- Phyllonorycter rebimbasi (Mendes, 1910)

Synonyms
- Lithocolletis rebimbasi Mendes, 1910; Lithocolletis glaserorum Deschka, 1969

Species of moth

Phyllonorycter rebimbasi is a moth of the family Gracillariidae. It is known from southern France and the Iberian Peninsula.

The larvae feed on Quercus coccifera. They mine the leaves of their host plant.
