= Phyllonorycter parvifoliella =

Scientific classification
- Domain: Eukaryota
- Kingdom: Animalia
- Phylum: Arthropoda
- Class: Insecta
- Order: Lepidoptera
- Family: Gracillariidae
- Genus: Phyllonorycter
- Species: P. parvifoliella

Binomial name
- Phyllonorycter parvifoliella (Ragonot, 1875)

Synonyms
- Lithocolletis parvifoliella Ragonot, 1875

Species of moth

Phyllonorycter parvifoliella is a moth of the family Gracillariidae. It is known from France and Portugal.

The larvae feed on Adenocarpus complicatus. They mine the leaves of their host plant.
