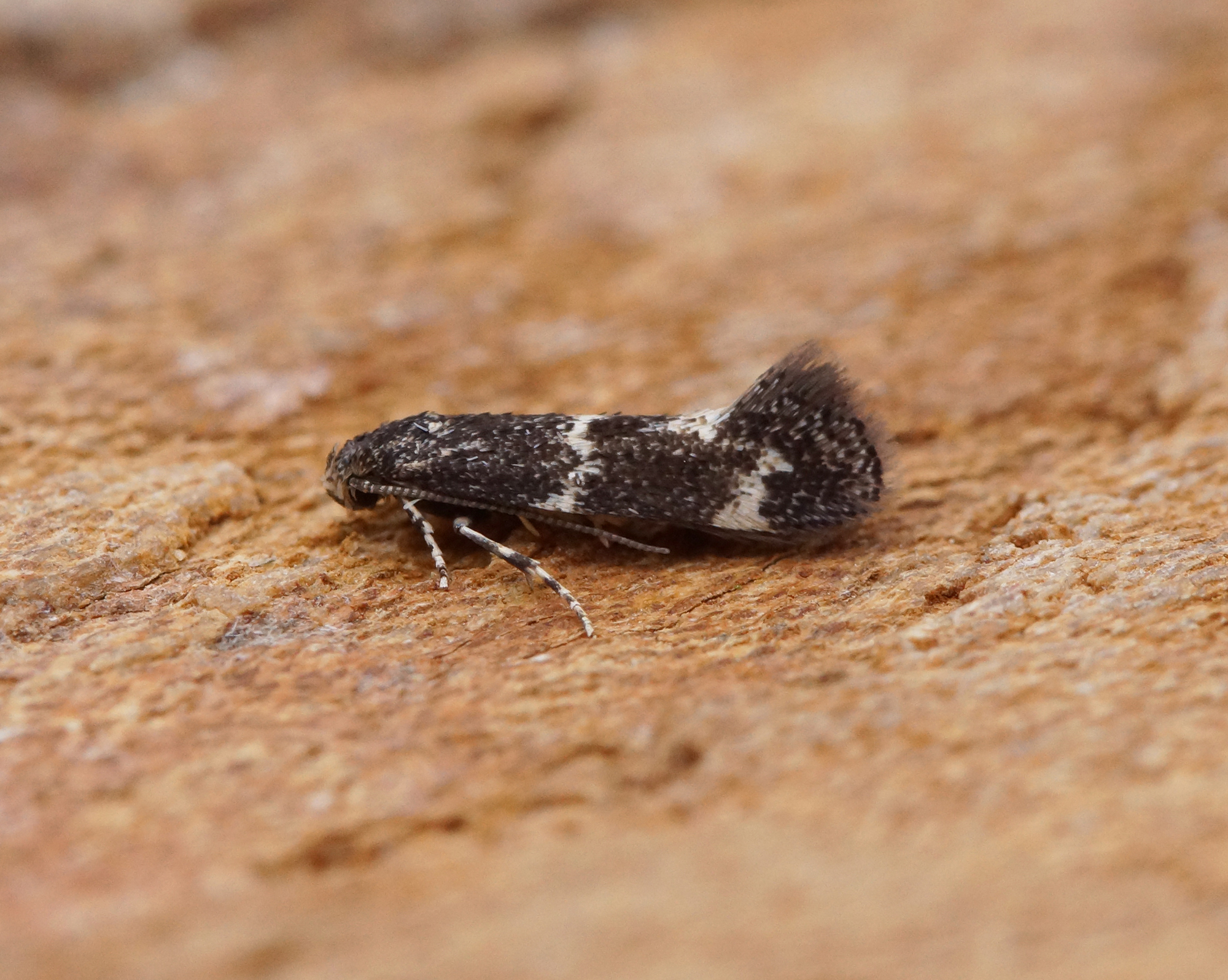

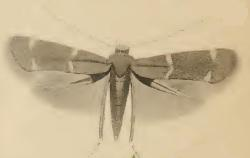

Scientific classification
- Domain: Eukaryota
- Kingdom: Animalia
- Phylum: Arthropoda
- Class: Insecta
- Order: Lepidoptera
- Family: Elachistidae
- Genus: Elachista
- Species: E. subnigrella

Binomial name
- Elachista subnigrella Douglas, 1853

= Elachista subnigrella =

Species of moth

Elachista subnigrella is a moth of the family Elachistidae found in Europe.

== Description ==
The wingspan is 7–9 millimetres (0.28–0.35 in). The head is dark grey, face lighter. Forewings blackish-grey, light-sprinkled, in female darker except on basal area; a slender indistinct fascia before middle, somewhat indented or interrupted on fold, in male sometimes almost obsolete, a small indistinct tornal spot, and costal spot somewhat beyond it whitish, in female whiter and more distinct. Hindwings are rather dark grey. The larva is pale yellow; head pale brown. Hindwings are grey.

== Biology ==
Adults are on wing from April to May.

The larvae feed on Avena, Avenula pubescens, Bromus erectus, Calamagrostis epigejos, Dactylis glomerata, Festuca and Holcus mollis. They mine the leaves of their host plant. Larvae can be found from April to May and again in July.

== Distribution ==
It is found from Scandinavia and the Baltic States to the Pyrenees and Italy and from Ireland to Romania.
