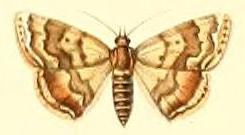
- Illustration of adult

Scientific classification
- Kingdom: Animalia
- Phylum: Arthropoda
- Class: Insecta
- Order: Lepidoptera
- Family: Geometridae
- Genus: Scopula
- Species: S. reaumuraria

Binomial name
- Scopula reaumuraria (Milliere, 1864)

Synonyms
- Cleta reaumuraria Milliere, 1864; Oar reaumuraria

= Scopula reaumuraria =

Species of moth

Scopula reaumuraria is a moth of the family Geometridae. It is found in south-eastern Spain and near Cádiz.

The wingspan is about 17 mm.

== Taxonomy ==
The species was formerly considered a synonym of Scopula pratana.
