= Eupithecia senorita =

Scientific classification
- Kingdom: Animalia
- Phylum: Arthropoda
- Clade: Pancrustacea
- Class: Insecta
- Order: Lepidoptera
- Family: Geometridae
- Genus: Eupithecia
- Species: E. senorita

Binomial name
- Eupithecia senorita Mironov, 2003

Species of moth

Eupithecia senorita is a moth in the family Geometridae that can be found in France and Spain.
