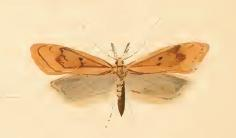

Scientific classification
- Domain: Eukaryota
- Kingdom: Animalia
- Phylum: Arthropoda
- Class: Insecta
- Order: Lepidoptera
- Family: Gelechiidae
- Genus: Dichomeris
- Species: D. derasella

Binomial name
- Dichomeris derasella (Denis & Schiffermüller, 1775)

Synonyms
- Tinea derasella Denis & Schiffermuller, 1775; Tinea fasciella Hubner, 1796; Ypsolophus unguiculatus Fabricius, 1798; Dichomeris coreanus Matsumura, 1931; Dichomeris paranthes Meyrick, 1936

= Dichomeris derasella =

Species of moth

Dichomeris derasella is a moth of the family Gelechiidae. It is found in most of Europe, except Ireland, Norway, Sweden, the Iberian Peninsula and part of the Balkan Peninsula.

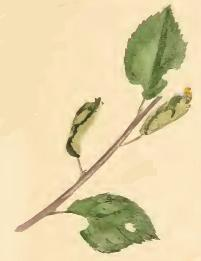
A sprig of sloe with leaves rolled up by larva

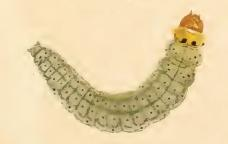
Larva

The wingspan is 21–22 mm. Adults are on wing from mid-April to the end of May in one generation per year.

The larvae feed on Cerasus, Crataegus, Malus sylvestris and Rubus.
