= Elachista bigorrensis =

Scientific classification
- Kingdom: Animalia
- Phylum: Arthropoda
- Class: Insecta
- Order: Lepidoptera
- Family: Elachistidae
- Genus: Elachista
- Species: E. bigorrensis

Binomial name
- Elachista bigorrensis Traugott-Olsen, 1990

Species of moth

Elachista bigorrensis is a moth of the family Elachistidae that is endemic to France.
