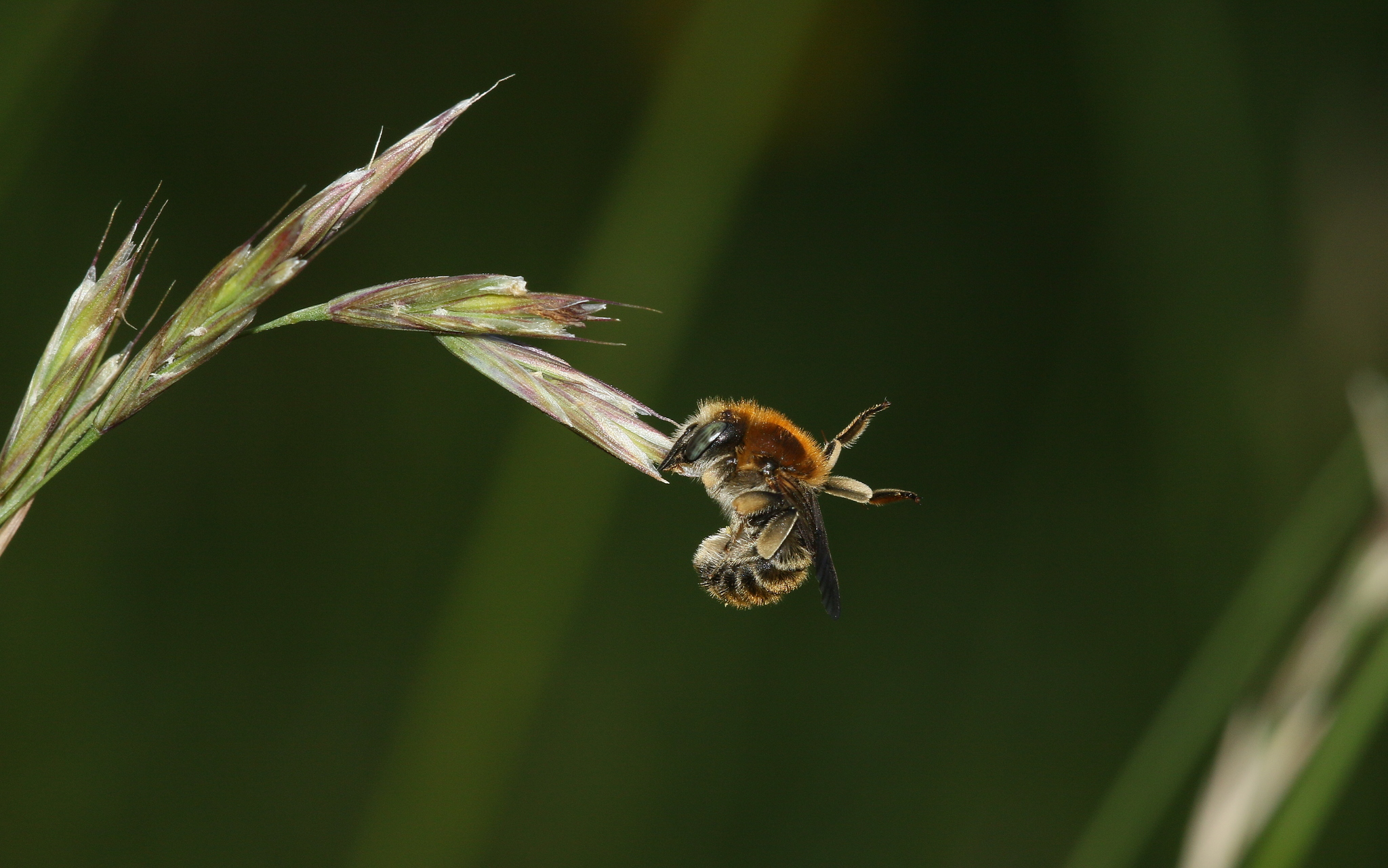
- Oberelsbach, Germany, June 2020

Scientific classification
- Kingdom: Animalia
- Phylum: Arthropoda
- Clade: Pancrustacea
- Class: Insecta
- Order: Hymenoptera
- Family: Megachilidae
- Genus: Trachusa
- Species: T. byssina

Binomial name
- Trachusa byssina (Panzer, 1798)

= Trachusa byssina =

Species of bee

Trachusa byssina (also called byssal resin-leafcutter) is a species of bees within the genus Trachusa.

== Description ==
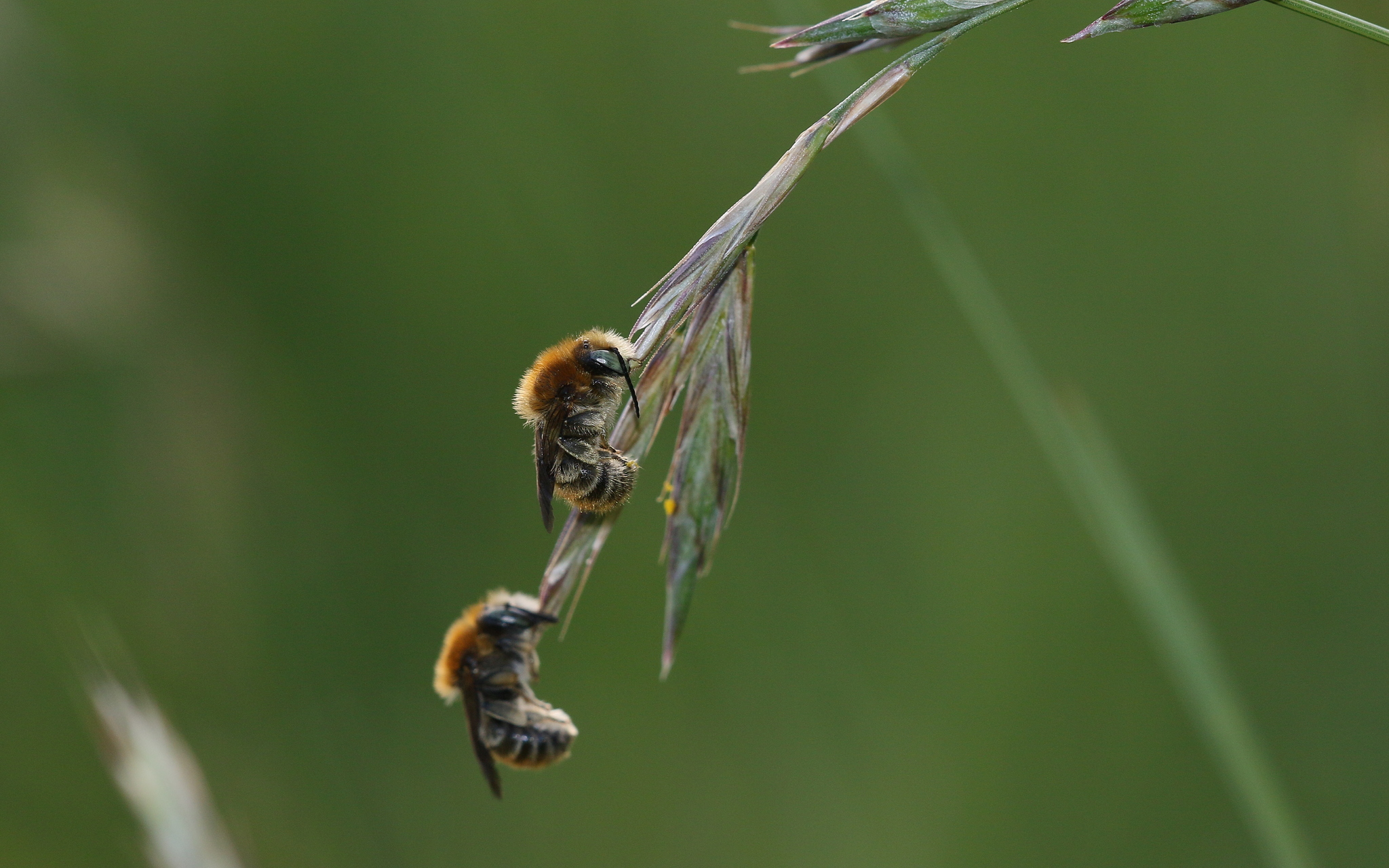
sleeping byssal resin-leafcutter (Trachusa byssina), Oberelsbach, Germany, June 2020

This species measures from 11 to 12 mm. Males are without light spots on the body with the exception of the yellow-colored face. The abdomen end is not reinforced as in many other Anthidium species. In the female, the thorax is hairy fox-red. The abdomen is sparsely covered in light brown hair with inconspicuous hair ties on the tergite ends. The belly brush is white. Both genders can be identified with experience in the field.

== Range ==
This species is distributed from Portugal through Europe, Asia Minor, Caucasus, Central Asia and Siberia to the Amur Oblast and the Jewish Autonomous Oblast. North to 60° N in Norway (Oppland), 63 ° N in Sweden), 64° N in Finland (Kokkola / Central Ostrobothnia), in Russia to Karelia, Kirov and Perm. South to Abruzzo, northern Greece (Olymp / Timfi) and northern Turkey. Currently it is reported from almost all regions in Central Europe, only historically in Schleswig-Holstein, the Lake Geneva area and southern Ticino. In Germany the species is widespread, from the plains to higher mountain areas and moderately frequent.

== Habitat ==
In central Europe this species can be found mainly in the low mountain ranges and there on the south-facing forest edges, which border directly on poor meadows or have a broad, herbaceous border. It occurs also on wide, sunny forest paths or clearings with larger Lotus stands. Also on inland dunes, in sand heaths, in old fallow vineyards, on extensively grazed or fallow sheep pastures (juniper heaths) as well as in abandoned sand pits and quarries. Often syntopic with Anthidium strigatum. Nests are preferably in slightly sloping, more or less south-exposed places that are not or only sparsely overgrown and where the soil is at least somewhat solidified (e.g. by step, moss, grass roots). It uses different types of soil and also nests in humus soil, but most often sandy soil or loess loam are colonized. In the vicinity of the nesting site, conifers, especially pines (Pinus sylvestris) and deciduous trees, must grow as suppliers of building material. The females sometimes collect 100–200 m from the nesting site.

== Ecology ==
Trachusa byssina is univoltin. The flight period ranges from early June to mid-August. Hibernation happens as a resting larva in the cocoon.

Trachusa byssina is an oligolectic species specializing in Fabaceae. The main pollen source is Lotus corniculatus. Pollen is also collected from other Fabaceae, especially where it only blooms sporadically or not at all. The following are documented: Lotus uliginosus, Onobrychis viciifolia, Ononis repens, Ononis spinosa, Vicia cracca, Lathyrus heterophyllus, Lathyrus sylvestris, Lathyrus tuberosus, Lathyrus pratensis, Medicago sativa and Securigera varia. The females usually stick to certain flowering plants, especially when they collect on Lotus, but often two, occasionally three plant species are used during a collecting flight. All the pollen sources mentioned except Ononis and Securigera also offer the females nectar, which is abundantly added to the larval provisions. The males patrol flowering Lotus plants.

Trachusa byssina nests in self-dug cavities in the earth, singly or in small colonies (clusters of 10-50 nests). The nest is a branching earth tube 10–15 cm long. 2-4 brood cells are placed one behind the other at the end of the side aisles. For the construction of the cells, strips are cut out of the leaves of various trees and herbs, which serve as cell walls. Leaves from birch (Betula), hawthorn (Crataegus), willowherb (Epilobium), beech (Fagus sylvatica), English oak (Quercus robur), roses (Rosa) or blackberries (Rubus fruticosus) are used. Small bits of resin are then collected and deposited at the end of the brood cell until there is a sufficient amount to coat the inside of the leaves with a layer of resin. The inside is mostly covered by pine resin (Pinus sylvestris), possibly also by spruce (Picea abies).

Trachusa byssina is probably used as host species by Coelioxys quadridentata and Aglaoapis tridentata, which are suspected to be cuckoo bees.

== Etymology ==
From Latin "byssina" = "made of the finest linen, calico, from batiste" (Greek foreign word).

== Taxonomy ==
Subgenus Trachusa PANZER, 1804.

Synonym: Anthidium byssinum PANZER, 1805; Trachusa serratulae TANK, 1804.
