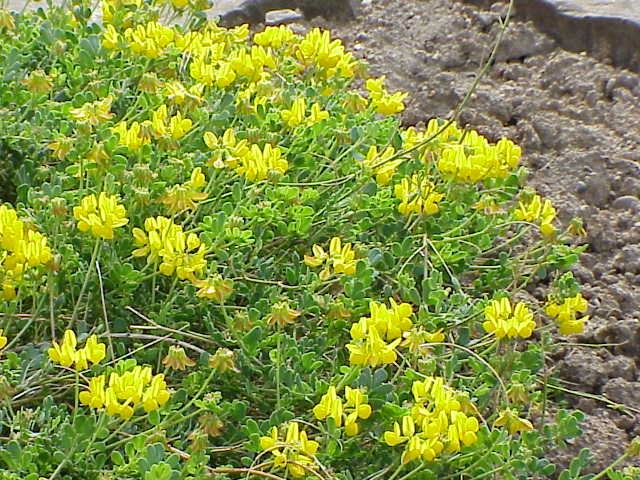
- Coronilla minima

Scientific classification
- Kingdom: Plantae
- Clade: Embryophytes
- Clade: Tracheophytes
- Clade: Angiosperms
- Clade: Eudicots
- Clade: Rosids
- Order: Fabales
- Family: Fabaceae
- Subfamily: Faboideae
- Tribe: Loteae
- Genus: Coronilla; L.

Type species
- Coronilla valentina L.

Synonyms
- Artrolobium Desv.

= Coronilla =

Genus of flowering plants in the legume family

The genus Coronilla contains 8 species of flowering plants native to Europe and North Africa. It contained about 20 species until Securigera was split off.

Species include:

- Coronilla coronata
- Coronilla juncea
- Coronilla minima
- Coronilla ramosissima
- Coronilla repanda
- Coronilla scorpioides
- Coronilla vaginalis
- Coronilla valentina

Species that were part of the genus include:

- Securigera elegans
- Securigera orientalis
- Securigera varia L. (crown vetch)

== See also ==
- Securigera, a segregate genus of Coronilla
