= Coleophora flaviella =

Scientific classification
- Kingdom: Animalia
- Phylum: Arthropoda
- Class: Insecta
- Order: Lepidoptera
- Family: Coleophoridae
- Genus: Coleophora
- Species: C. flaviella

Binomial name
- Coleophora flaviella Mann, 1857

Synonyms
- Coleophora infibulatella Hofmann, 1874

Species of moth

Coleophora flaviella is a moth of the family Coleophoridae. It is found from Germany to the Iberian Peninsula, Sicily and Greece and from France to Romania.

The larvae feed on Coronilla coronata and Coronilla minima.
