= Isturgia univirgaria =

Scientific classification
- Domain: Eukaryota
- Kingdom: Animalia
- Phylum: Arthropoda
- Class: Insecta
- Order: Lepidoptera
- Family: Geometridae
- Genus: Isturgia
- Species: I. univirgaria

Binomial name
- Isturgia univirgaria (Mabille, 1880)

Synonyms
- Tephrina univirgaria

Species of moth

Isturgia univirgaria is a moth of the family Geometridae. It is found in Madagascar and Comoros.

The length of its forewings ranges between 12 and 15mm, and it is colored mostly white, striped with light brown. This species is similar to Isturgia catalaunaria (Guenée, 1857) and has been misidentified with this species in the past.

== Biology ==
Most specimens are collected from the central highlands of Madagascar, at altitudes between 1000–1600 meters. They are usually found between December and March.
