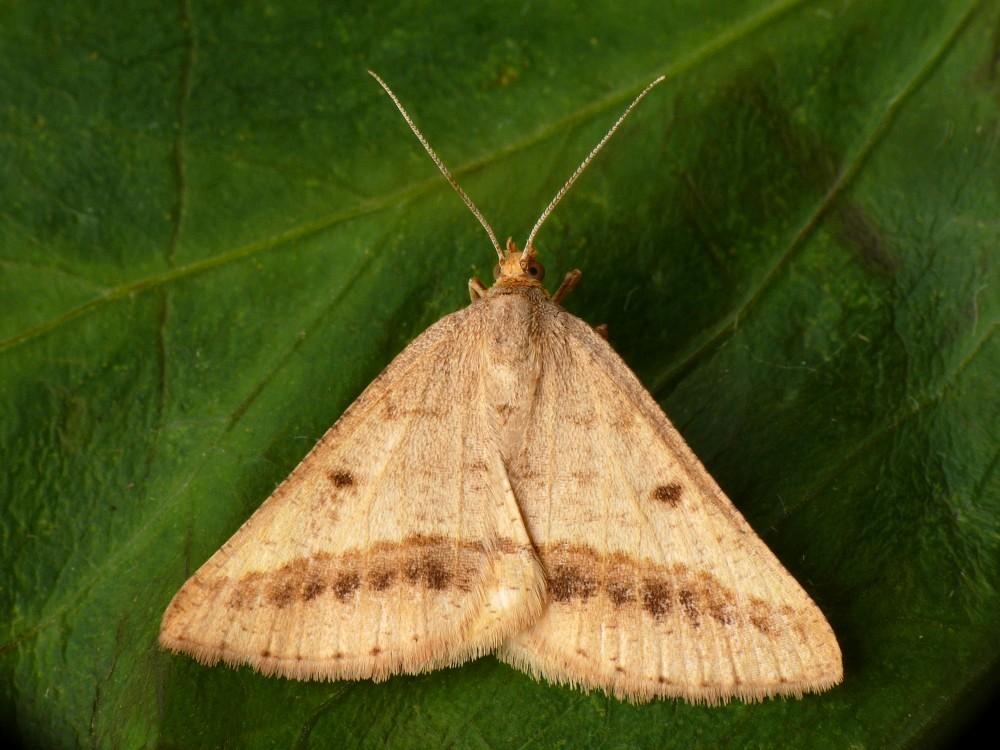
- Female
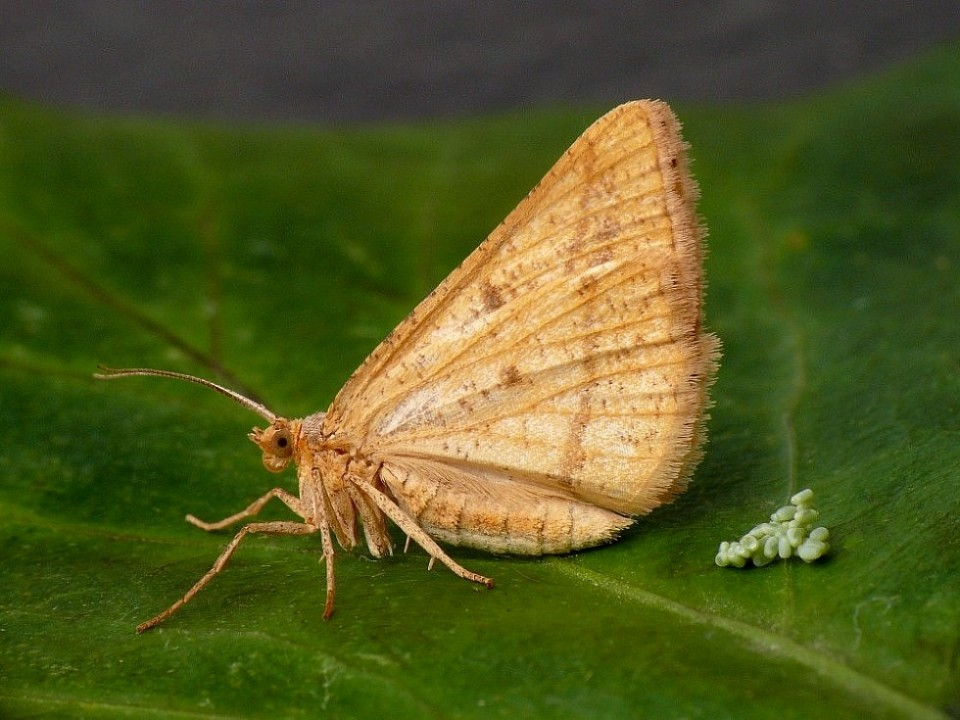
- Female with eggs

Scientific classification
- Domain: Eukaryota
- Kingdom: Animalia
- Phylum: Arthropoda
- Class: Insecta
- Order: Lepidoptera
- Family: Geometridae
- Genus: Isturgia
- Species: I. arenacearia

Binomial name
- Isturgia arenacearia (Denis & Schiffermüller, 1775)

Synonyms
- Geometra arenacearia Denis & Schiffermüller, 1775; Tephrina arenacearia

= Isturgia arenacearia =

Species of moth

Isturgia arenacearia, the sand bordered bloom, is a moth of the family Geometridae. It was first described by Michael Denis and Ignaz Schiffermüller in 1775.

== Distribution ==
This species can be found in most of Europe (Sardinia, Corsica, Italy, Switzerland, Slovenia, Austria the Czech Republic, Poland, Slovakia, Hungary, Romania, Serbia and Montenegro, Bulgaria, Albania, North Macedonia, Greece, Crete, Ukraine and Russia) in the eastern Palearctic realm, and in the Near East.

== Habitat ==
These moths inhabit scrubs, dry steppes, xerothermic slopes, meadows and in areas cultivated with alfalfa.

== Description ==
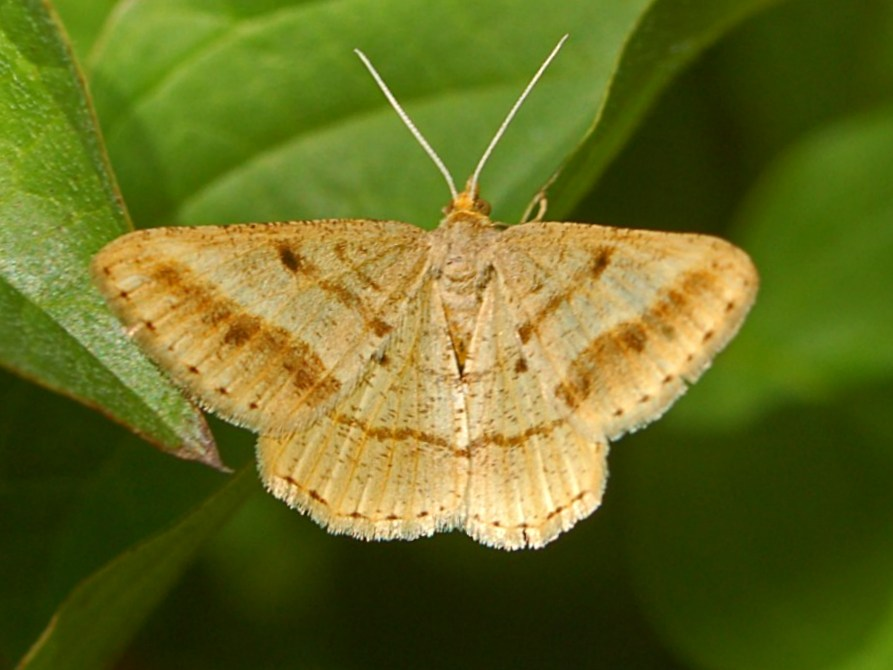
Spread wings

Isturgia arenacearia has a wingspan of 21–27 mm. The basic color of the wings is light brown. The forewings have, in the submarginal area, a darker brown band. A barely visible line is also present, usually with a small dark spot. A series of small dark spots are present along the edge. The hindwings are cream-colored, crossed by a brown line and with small dark spots on the border. All four wings are fringed. The underside of the wings is predominantly gray or light brown. The thorax shows the same color of the wings, while the abdomen and the head are yellow ocher.

Caterpillars are green with thin longitudinal white lines.

This species is rather similar to Isturgia murinaria.

== Biology ==
Adults fly in two generations from June to September. The larvae feed on Coronilla varia, clover (Trifolium species) and various other Fabaceae.
