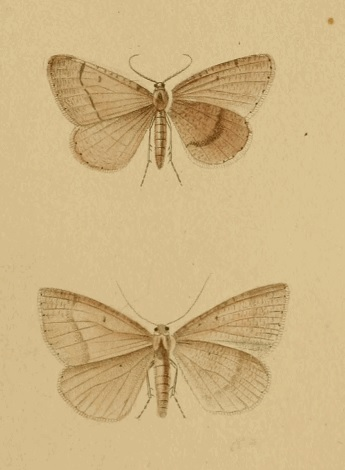

Scientific classification
- Domain: Eukaryota
- Kingdom: Animalia
- Phylum: Arthropoda
- Class: Insecta
- Order: Lepidoptera
- Family: Geometridae
- Genus: Isturgia
- Species: I. spodiaria

Binomial name
- Isturgia spodiaria (A. Lefèvre, [1832])

Synonyms
- Fidonia spodiaria Lefèvre, [1832]; Enconista spodiaria; Thamnonoma semicanaria Freyer, 1833

= Isturgia spodiaria =

Species of moth

Isturgia spodiaria is a moth of the family Geometridae. It was described by A. Lefèvre in 1832. It is found in Spain, Malta and North Africa.

The wingspan is 28–30 mm.
