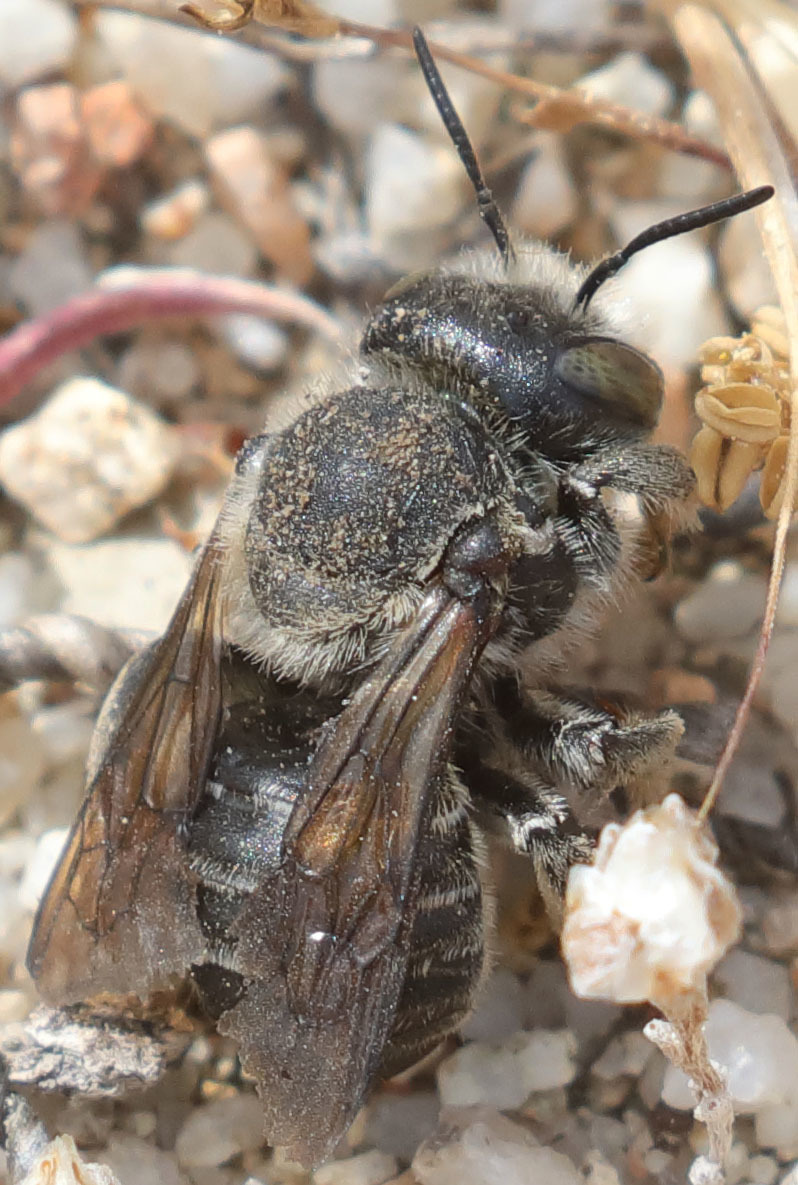
- (from iNaturalist)

Scientific classification
- Kingdom: Animalia
- Phylum: Arthropoda
- Class: Insecta
- Order: Hymenoptera
- Family: Megachilidae
- Genus: Trachusa
- Species: T. perdita

Binomial name
- Trachusa perdita Cockerell, 1904

= Trachusa perdita =

Species of bee

Trachusa perdita, the California leafcutting bee, is a species of bee in the family Megachilidae.

Trachusa perdita inhabits semiarid hillsides with shrubbery or tall grass growth.

== Description ==
Trachusa perdita is a dark grey bee with white bands of hairs on its abdomen. Its pollen basket is located under its abdomen, and the bee grows from one-half inch to three-eighths of an inch. Like most bees, Trachusa perdita feeds on nectar - only the larvae of this species feed on pollen.

== Reproduction ==
Trachusa perdita nests are made when female bees burrow diagonal tunnels into hillsides, which branch off into the individual brood cells. Each brood cell is a small cell lined by leaves and provisioned with nectar and pollen. Once the cell is provisioned with the nectar and pollen, an egg is placed in the cell, where the bee will grow. The nests of T. perdita are lined only with the leaves of the Buckthorn Shrub.

The only other known North American bee in the genus Trachusa occurs in California as well.
