= Trachusa cordaticeps =

Scientific classification
- Domain: Eukaryota
- Kingdom: Animalia
- Phylum: Arthropoda
- Class: Insecta
- Order: Hymenoptera
- Family: Megachilidae
- Tribe: Anthidiini
- Genus: Trachusa
- Species: T. cordaticeps

Binomial name
- Trachusa cordaticeps (Michener, 1949)

Species of bee

Trachusa cordaticeps is a species of bee in the family Megachilidae. It is found in Central America and North America.
