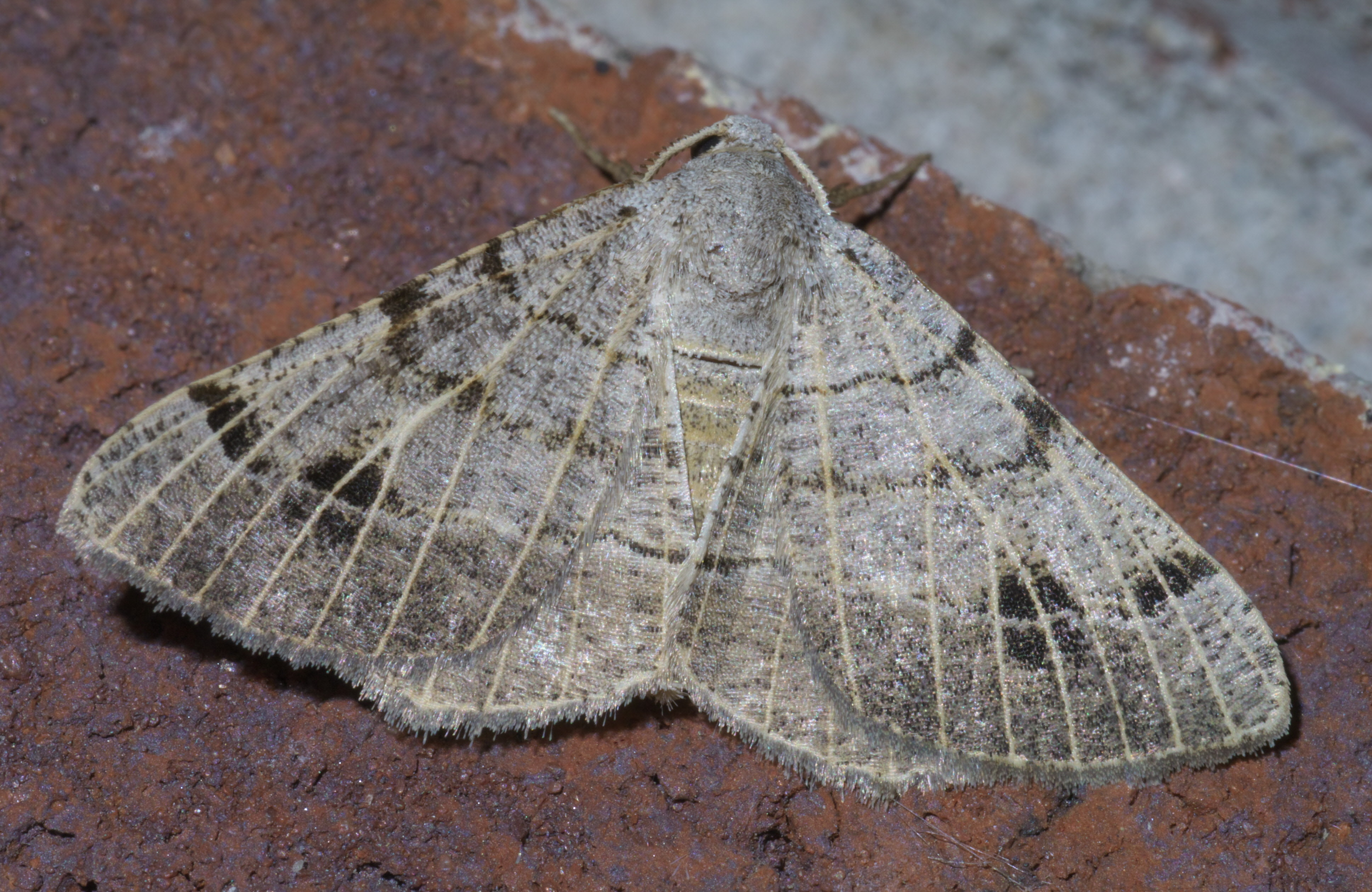

Scientific classification
- Kingdom: Animalia
- Phylum: Arthropoda
- Class: Insecta
- Order: Lepidoptera
- Family: Geometridae
- Genus: Isturgia
- Species: I. dislocaria

Binomial name
- Isturgia dislocaria (Packard, 1876)

Synonyms
- Isturgia dislocaria malefactaria (Barnes & McDunnough, 1917); Phasiane dislocaria malefactaria Barnes & McDunnough, 1917; Semiothisa dislocaria Packard, 1876

= Isturgia dislocaria =

Species of moth

Isturgia dislocaria, the pale-veined isturgia moth, is a species of geometrid moth in the family Geometridae. It first described by Alpheus Spring Packard in 1876 and it is found in North America.

The MONA or Hodges number for Isturgia dislocaria is 6419.
