= Trachusa manni =

Scientific classification
- Domain: Eukaryota
- Kingdom: Animalia
- Phylum: Arthropoda
- Class: Insecta
- Order: Hymenoptera
- Family: Megachilidae
- Tribe: Anthidiini
- Genus: Trachusa
- Species: T. manni

Binomial name
- Trachusa manni Crawford, 1917

Species of bee

Trachusa manni is a species of bee in the family Megachilidae. It is found in North America.
