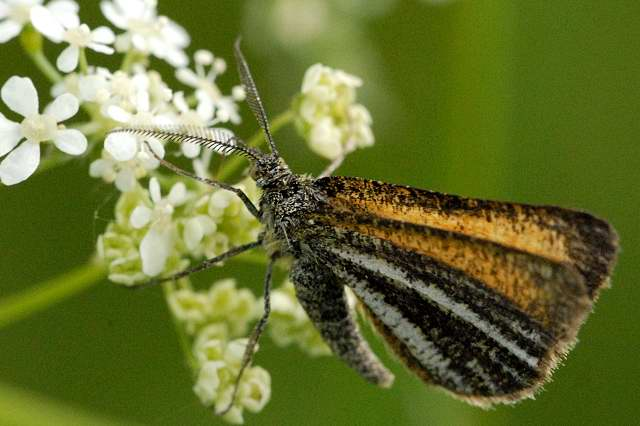
- Male, underside
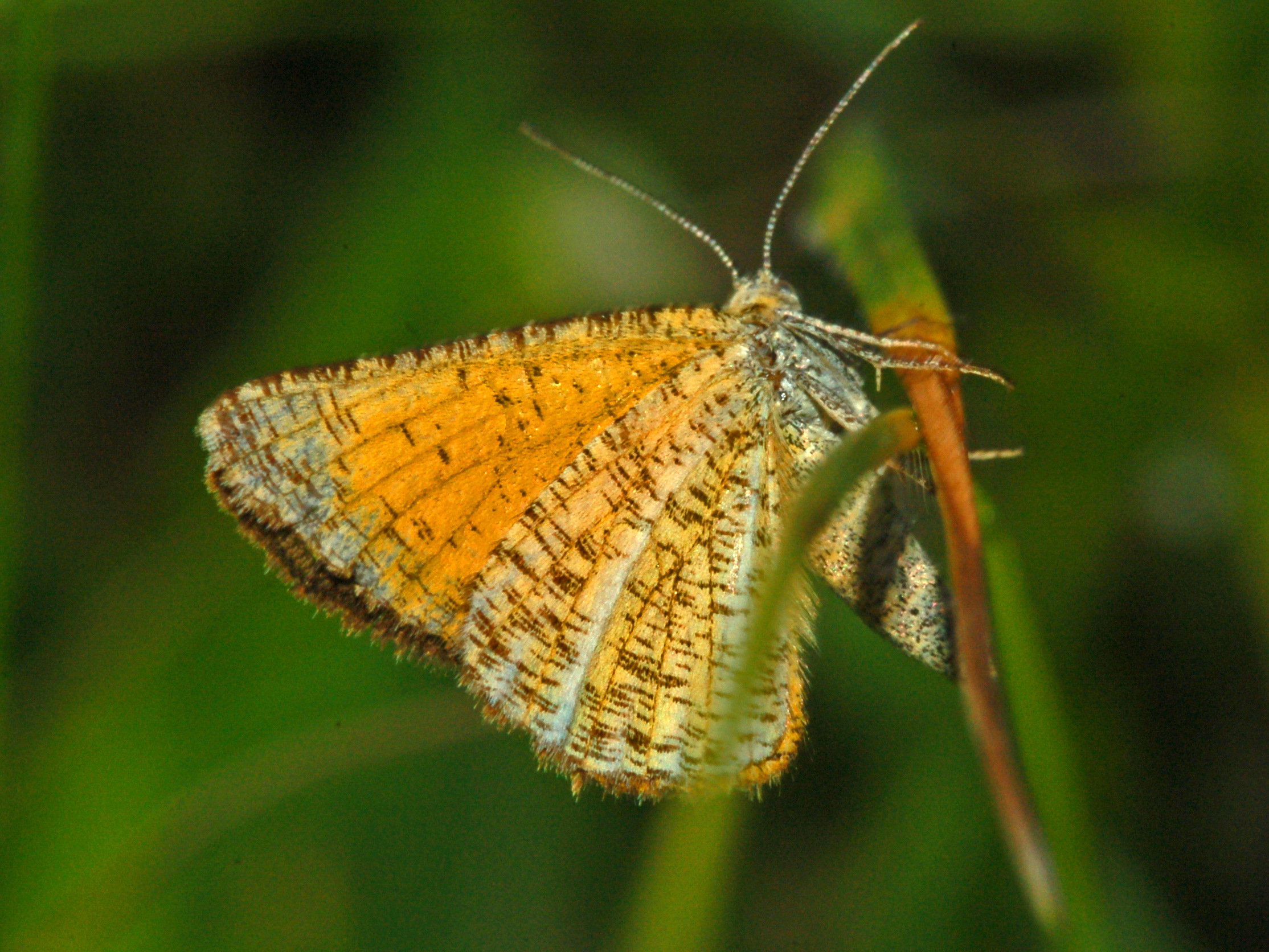
- Female

Scientific classification
- Kingdom: Animalia
- Phylum: Arthropoda
- Class: Insecta
- Order: Lepidoptera
- Family: Geometridae
- Genus: Isturgia
- Species: I. limbaria

Binomial name
- Isturgia limbaria (Fabricius, 1775)

Synonyms
- Phalaena limbaria Fabricius, 1775

= Isturgia limbaria =

Species of moth

Isturgia limbaria, the frosted yellow, is a moth of the family Geometridae.

== Distribution ==
This species can be found in parts of Central and Southern Europe. It is extinct in Britain.

== Habitat ==
These moths inhabit heathers, edge of the forests and scrubby areas.

== Description ==
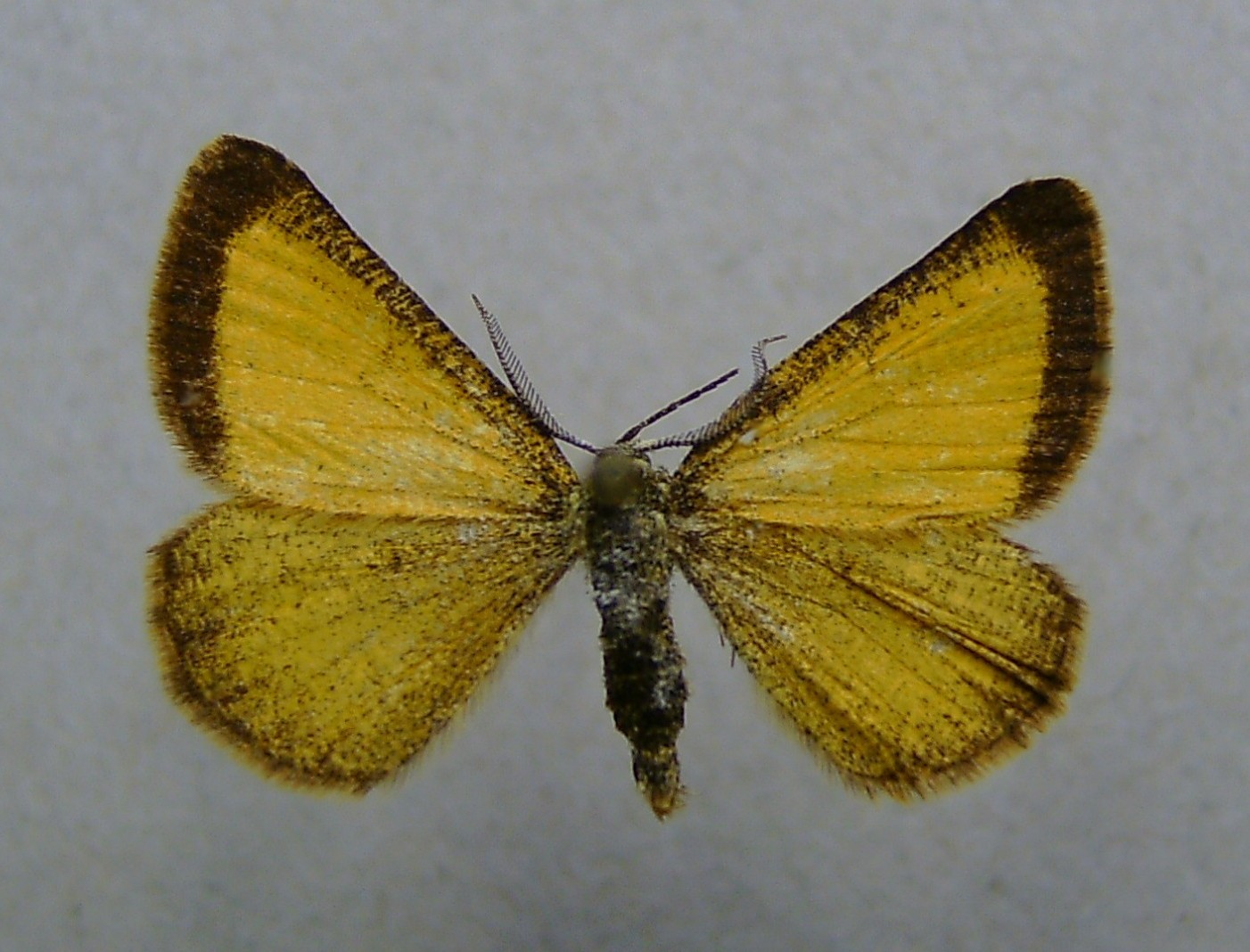
Mounted specimen

Isturgia limbaria has a wingspan of 26–30 millimetres (1.0–1.2 in). Forewings can reach a length of 13–15 millimetres (0.51–0.59 in). The male has feathered antennae, while those of the females are filiform. The upperside of the wings is yellow or orange yellow with a chocolate brown margin, less evident in the females. The underside of the hindwings is pale yellowish or greyish and strongly mottled, with visible longitudinal white stripes.

Movie of Isturgia limbaria

== Biology ==
These day-flying moths fly from mid April to mid August in one or two generation. The larvae feed on broom. They over-winter as a pupa.

1. The flight season refers to The Netherlands and Belgium. This may vary in other parts of the range.
