= Trachusa fontemvitae =

Scientific classification
- Domain: Eukaryota
- Kingdom: Animalia
- Phylum: Arthropoda
- Class: Insecta
- Order: Hymenoptera
- Family: Megachilidae
- Genus: Trachusa
- Species: T. fontemvitae

Binomial name
- Trachusa fontemvitae (Schwarz, 1926)

Species of bee

Trachusa fontemvitae is a species of leafcutter, mason, and resin bees in the family Megachilidae. It is found in North America.
