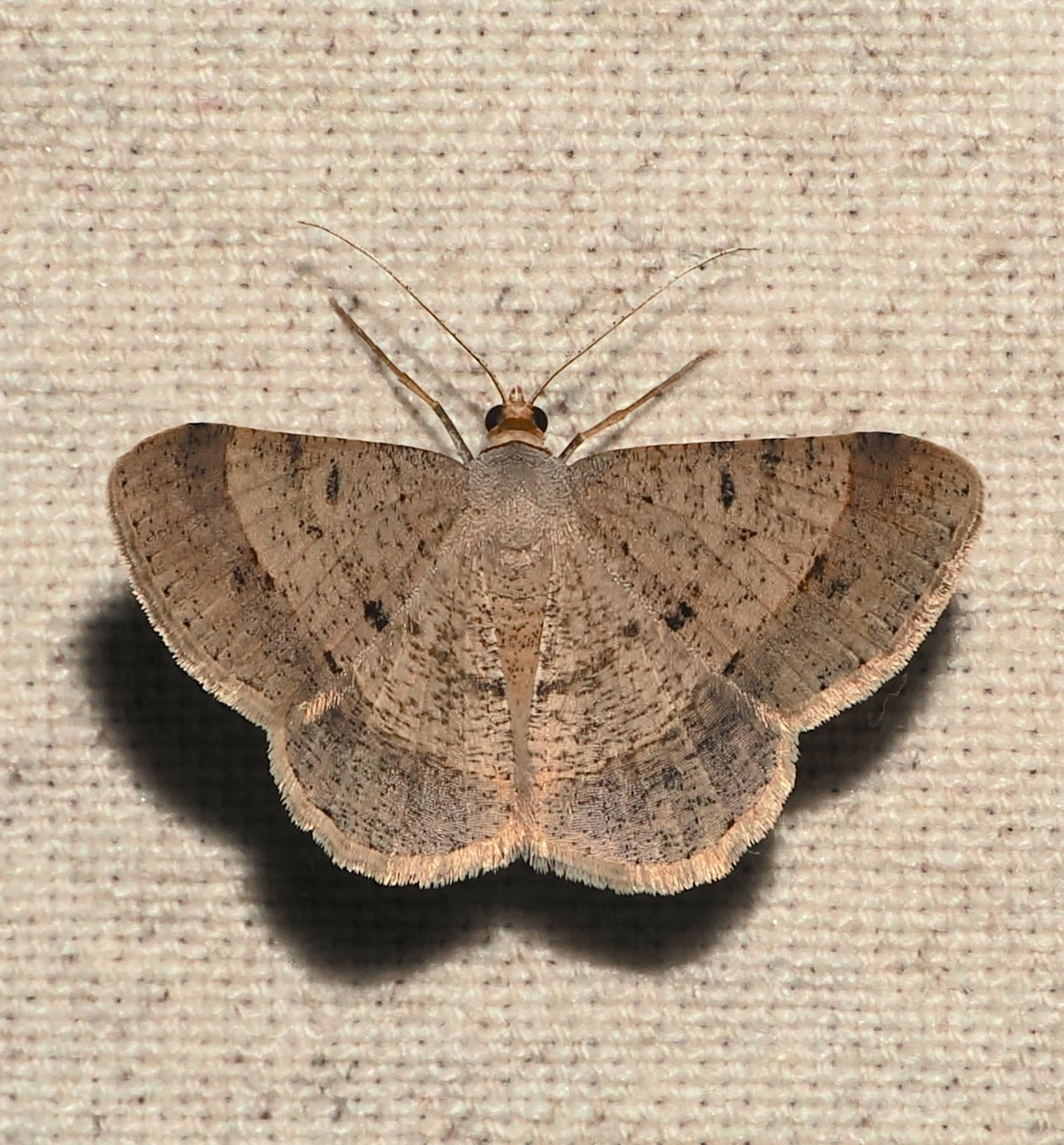
- Isturgia deerraria, South Africa

Scientific classification
- Kingdom: Animalia
- Phylum: Arthropoda
- Class: Insecta
- Order: Lepidoptera
- Family: Geometridae
- Genus: Isturgia
- Species: I. deerraria

Binomial name
- Isturgia deerraria (Walker, 1861)

Synonyms
- Species: Aspilates occupata Walker, 1862; Isturgia dissocia Warren, 1897; Isturgia nemorivaga (Wallengren, 1872); Isturgia occupata (Walker, 1862); Isturgia pulinda deerraria (Walker, 1861); Tephrina deerraria Walker, 1861; Tephrina nemorivaga Wallengren, 1872

= Isturgia deerraria =

Species of moths

Isturgia deerraria is a species of moth in the family Geometridae. It is found in Africa, southern Europe, and southern Asia.
