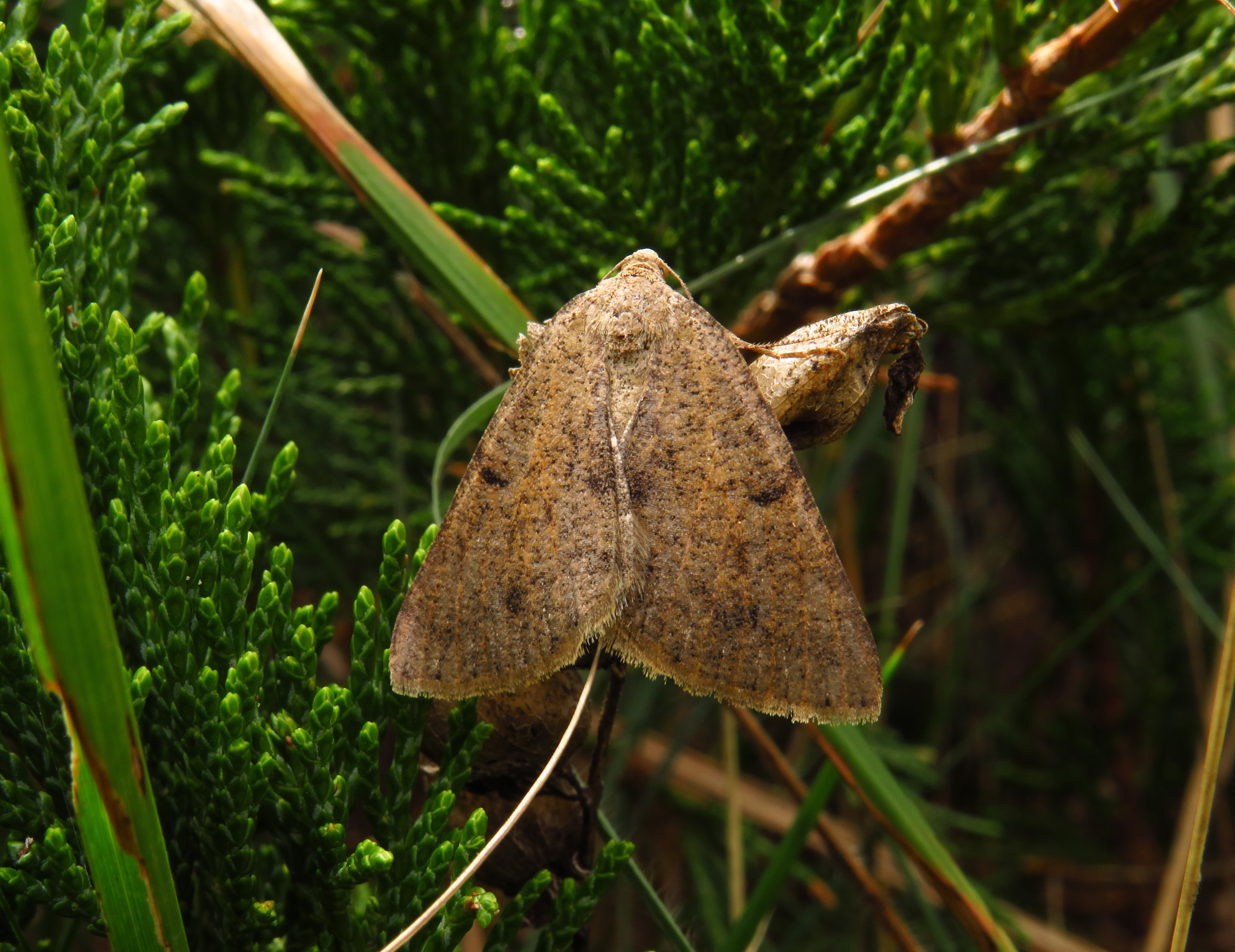

Scientific classification
- Kingdom: Animalia
- Phylum: Arthropoda
- Clade: Pancrustacea
- Class: Insecta
- Order: Lepidoptera
- Family: Geometridae
- Genus: Isturgia
- Species: I. miniosaria

Binomial name
- Isturgia miniosaria (Duponchel, 1829)

Synonyms
- Boarmia miniosaria Duponchel, 1829; Enconista miniosaria; Fidonia perspersaria Duponchel, 1829; Enconista gabriellae Silva Cruz, 1978

= Isturgia miniosaria =

Species of moth

Isturgia miniosaria is a species of moth in the family Geometridae. It is found in France, Spain and Portugal. It is also found in North Africa, including Morocco.

The larvae feed on the flowers of Genista and Ulex species.
