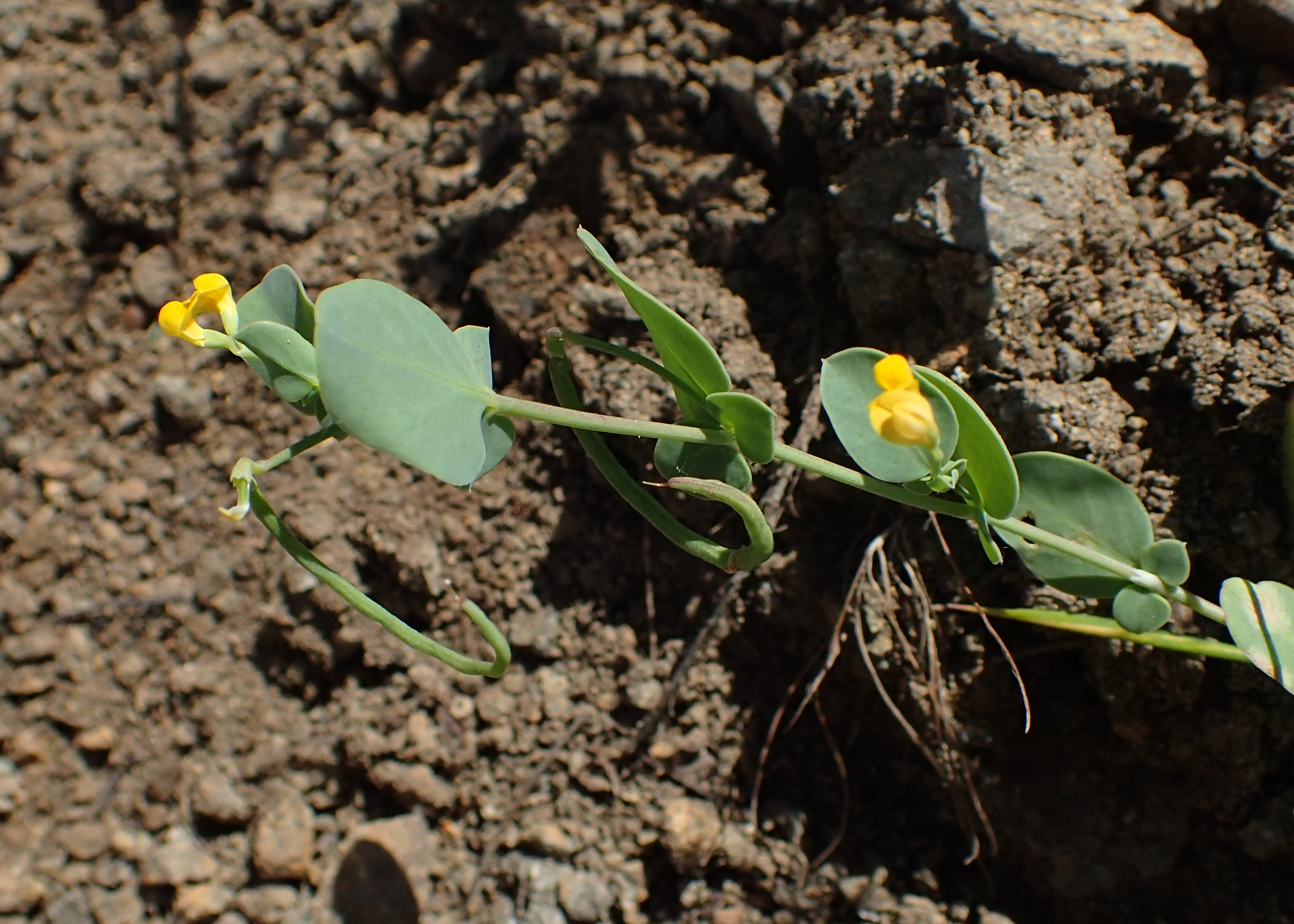
- In Armenia

Scientific classification
- Kingdom: Plantae
- Clade: Tracheophytes
- Clade: Angiosperms
- Clade: Eudicots
- Clade: Rosids
- Order: Fabales
- Family: Fabaceae
- Subfamily: Faboideae
- Genus: Coronilla
- Species: C. scorpioides

Binomial name
- Coronilla scorpioides (L.) W.D.J.Koch

Synonyms
- Artrolobium scorpioides (L.) Desv.; Aviunculus scorpioides (L.) Fourr.; Ornithopodium scorpioides (L.) Scop.; Ornithopus scorpioides L.; Scorpius scorpioides (L.) Medik.; Artrolobium tauricum Kalen.; Coronilla scorpioidea St.-Lag.; Coronilla trifoliolata Bubani; Ornithopodium triphyllum Moench; Ornithopus trifoliatus Lam.

= Coronilla scorpioides =

Species of plant

Coronilla scorpioides, the yellow crownvetch, is a species of annual herb in the family Fabaceae. It have a self-supporting growth form and compound, broad leaves. Individuals can grow to 20 cm tall.

== Sources ==
This article incorporates text from a free content work. Licensed under CC0 (license statement/permission). Text taken from Coronilla scorpioides. Encyclopedia of Life.
