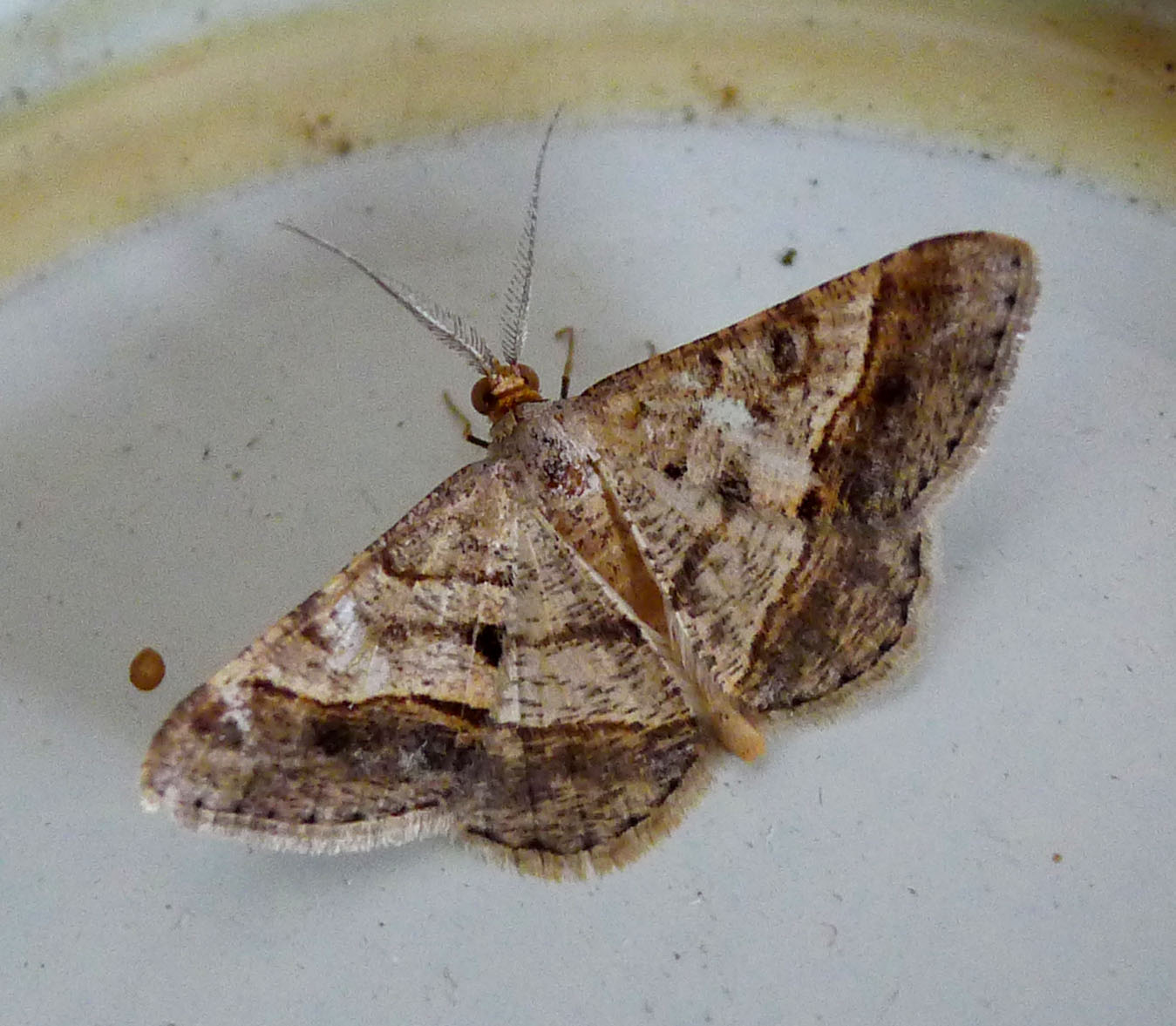

Scientific classification
- Kingdom: Animalia
- Phylum: Arthropoda
- Class: Insecta
- Order: Lepidoptera
- Family: Geometridae
- Genus: Isturgia
- Species: I. pulinda

Binomial name
- Isturgia pulinda (Walker, 1860)

Synonyms
- Tephrina pulinda Walker, 1860

= Isturgia pulinda =

Species of moth

Isturgia pulinda is a moth of the family Geometridae first described by Francis Walker in 1860. The species has a widespread distribution from the African countries of Botswana, Ethiopia, the Gambia, Kenya, Malawi, Mozambique, South Africa, Tanzania, Zambia and Zimbabwe to Saudi Arabia and Yemen towards the Indian subregion and Sri Lanka. In Europe, it is found in the Canary Islands, Spain, Portugal and the Cape Verde Islands.

Host plants of the caterpillar include Acacia tortilis, Acacia hirtella, Acacia nilotica, Acacia cyanophylla and Acacia karoo. Pupation occurs in a cocoon made by leaf litter.
