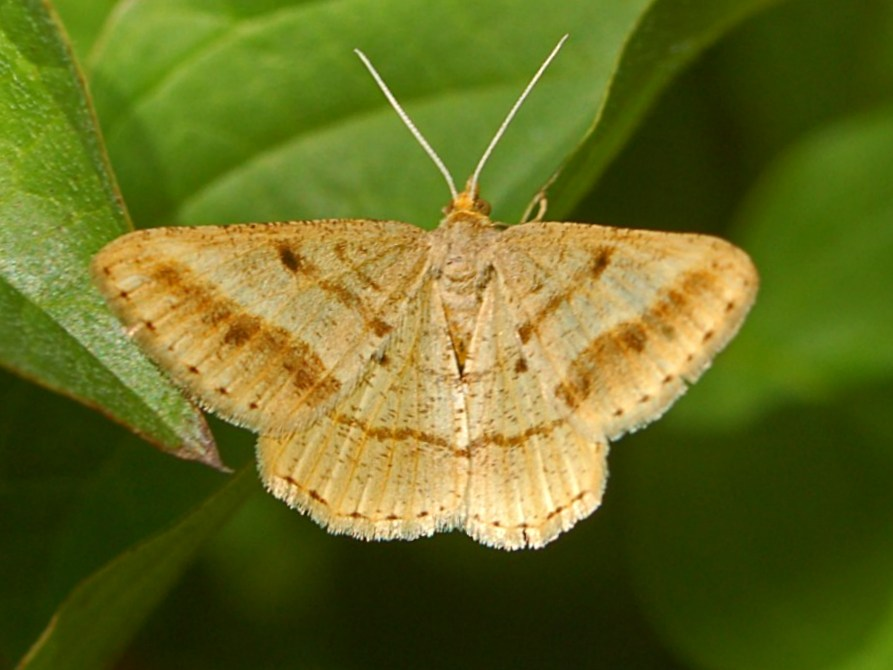
- Isturgia arenacearia

Scientific classification
- Kingdom: Animalia
- Phylum: Arthropoda
- Clade: Pancrustacea
- Class: Insecta
- Order: Lepidoptera
- Family: Geometridae
- Tribe: Macariini
- Genus: Isturgia; Hübner, [1823]

Synonyms
- Histurgia Agassiz, 1847; Enconista Lederer, 1853; Tephrina Guenée, [1845]; Bichroma Gumppenberg, 1887

= Isturgia =

Genus of moths

Isturgia is a genus of moths in the family Geometridae described by Jacob Hübner in 1823.

== Description ==
Palpi hairy and reaching beyond the frons. Hind tibia not dilated. Wings with evenly curved outer margin. Forewings of male usually with fovea. Vein 3 from angle of cell. Vein 7 to 9 stalked from upper angle and vein 10 absent. Vein 11 usually free. Hindwings with vein 3 from angle of cell. In the typical section of male has the branches of antennae very short.

== Species ==
- Isturgia arenacearia (Denis & Schiffermüller, 1775)
- Isturgia arenularia (Mabille, 1880)
- Isturgia assimilaria (Rambur, 1833)
- Isturgia arizeloides Krüger, 2001
- Isturgia berytaria (Staudinger, 1892)
- Isturgia catalaunaria (Guenée, 1857)
- Isturgia contexta (Saalmüller, 1891)
- Isturgia deerraria (Walker, 1861)
- Isturgia disputaria (Guenée, 1858)
- Isturgia dislocaria (Packard, 1876)
- Isturgia dukuduku Krüger, 2001
- Isturgia exerraria (Prout, 1925)
- Isturgia exospilata (Walker, 1861)
- Isturgia famula (Esper, 1787)
- Isturgia geminata (Warren, 1897)
- Isturgia hopfferaria Staudinger, 1878
- Isturgia inconspicuaria (Hübner, 1819)
- Isturgia kaszabi (Vojnits, 1974)
- Isturgia limbaria (Fabricius, 1775)
- Isturgia malesignaria (Mabille, 1880)
- Isturgia miniosaria (Duponchel, 1829)
- Isturgia modestaria (Pagenstecher, 1907)
- Isturgia murinaria (Denis & Schiffermüller, 1775)
- Isturgia penthearia Guenée, 1857
- Isturgia perplexa Krüger, 2001
- Isturgia pulinda (Walker, 1860)
- Isturgia pumicaria (Lederer, 1855)
- Isturgia roraria (Fabricius, 1776)
- Isturgia rubrior (Hausmann, 1990)
- Isturgia spissata (Walker, 1862)
- Isturgia spodiaria (Lefèbvre, 1832)
- Isturgia supergressa (Prout 1913)
- Isturgia tennoa (Pinker, 1978)
- Isturgia univirgaria (Mabille, 1880)
