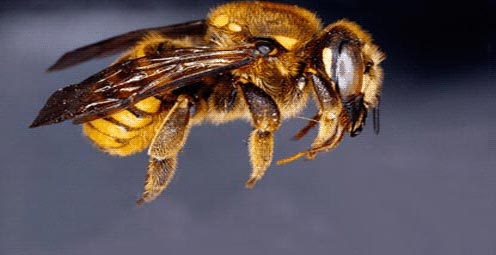

Scientific classification
- Domain: Eukaryota
- Kingdom: Animalia
- Phylum: Arthropoda
- Class: Insecta
- Order: Hymenoptera
- Family: Megachilidae
- Genus: Trachusa
- Species: T. zebrata

Binomial name
- Trachusa zebrata (Cresson, 1872)

= Trachusa zebrata =

Species of bee

Trachusa zebrata is a species of bee in the family Megachilidae. It is found in North America.
