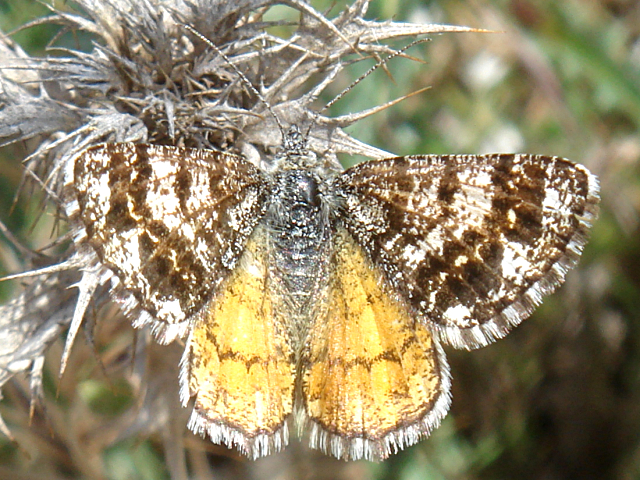

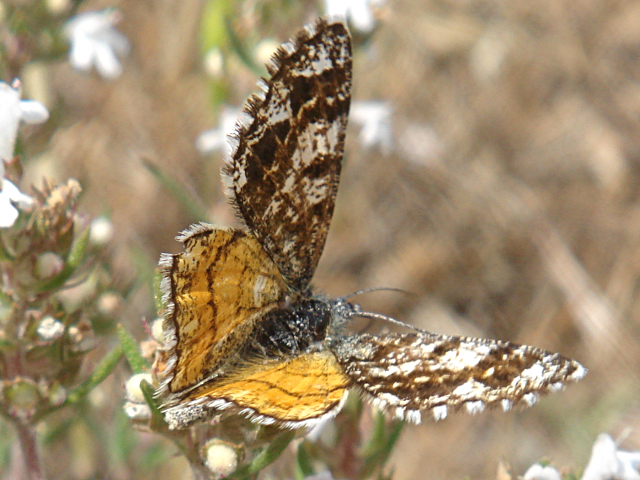

Scientific classification
- Domain: Eukaryota
- Kingdom: Animalia
- Phylum: Arthropoda
- Class: Insecta
- Order: Lepidoptera
- Family: Geometridae
- Genus: Isturgia
- Species: I. famula

Binomial name
- Isturgia famula (Esper, 1787)

Synonyms
- Noctua famula Esper, 1787

= Isturgia famula =

Species of moth

Isturgia famula is a moth of the family Geometridae. It is known from southern Europe.

Adults are on wing from May to June and are on wing during the day on sunny days.

The larvae feed on Cytisus, Genista, Sarothamnus, Spartium and Ulex species. It overwinters as a pupa in the ground.
