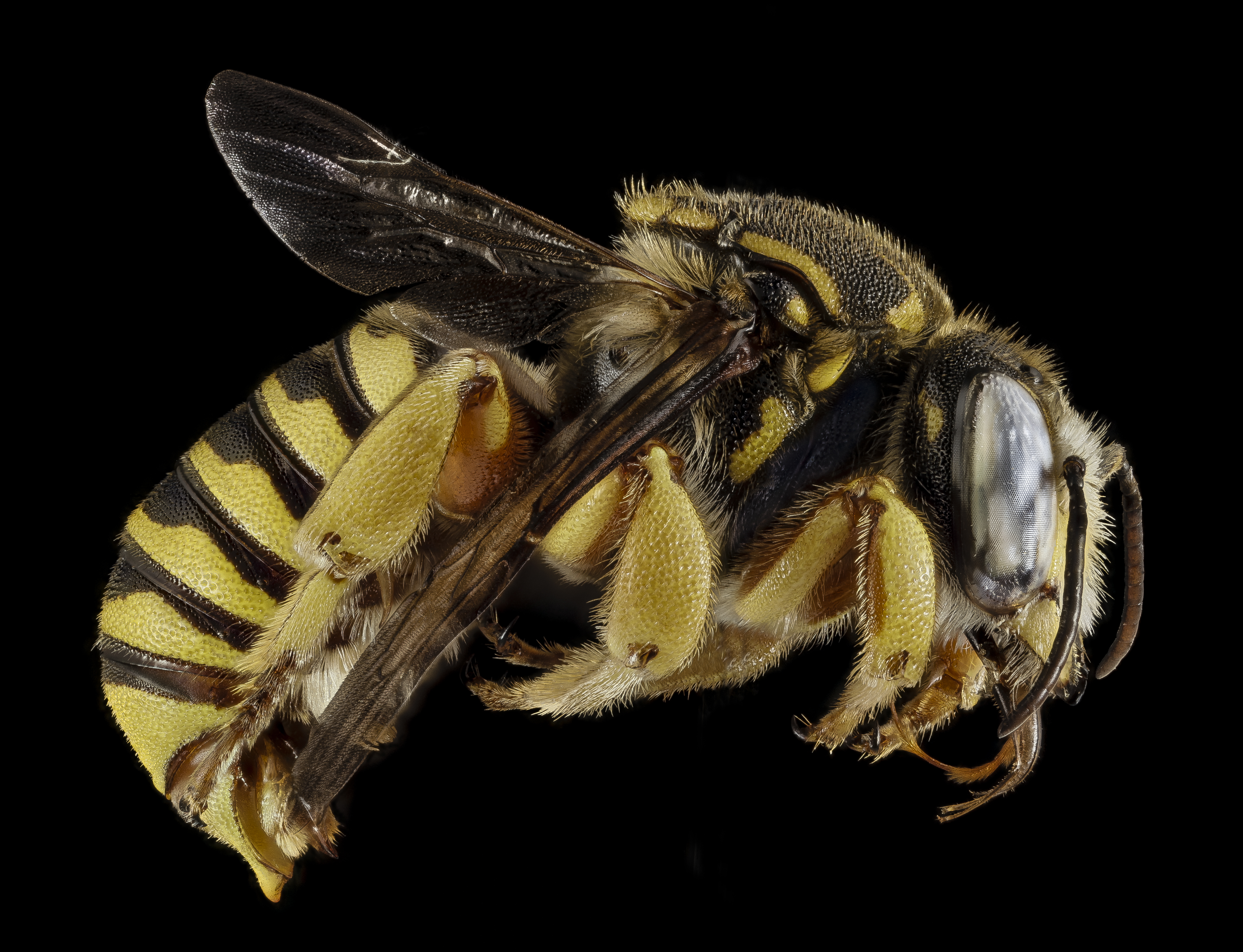

Scientific classification
- Kingdom: Animalia
- Phylum: Arthropoda
- Class: Insecta
- Order: Hymenoptera
- Family: Megachilidae
- Tribe: Anthidiini
- Genus: Trachusa
- Species: T. dorsalis

Binomial name
- Trachusa dorsalis (Lepeletier, 1841)

= Trachusa dorsalis =

Species of bee

Trachusa dorsalis is a species of bee in the family Megachilidae. It is found in North America.
