= Trachusa larreae =

Scientific classification
- Kingdom: Animalia
- Phylum: Arthropoda
- Class: Insecta
- Order: Hymenoptera
- Family: Megachilidae
- Tribe: Anthidiini
- Genus: Trachusa
- Species: T. larreae

Binomial name
- Trachusa larreae (Cockerell, 1897)

Species of bee

Trachusa larreae is a species of hymenopteran in the family Megachilidae. It is found in Central America and North America.
