= Isturgia contexta =

Scientific classification
- Kingdom: Animalia
- Phylum: Arthropoda
- Clade: Pancrustacea
- Class: Insecta
- Order: Lepidoptera
- Family: Geometridae
- Genus: Isturgia
- Species: I. contexta

Binomial name
- Isturgia contexta (Saalmüller, 1891)

Synonyms
- Tephrina contexta Saalmüller, 1891; Tephrina caeca Saalmüller, 1891

Species of moth

Isturgia contexta is a moth of the family Geometridae. It is found in Madagascar and Comoros.

The length of the forewings is 12 to 16mm. The wings are whitish/ochreous-grey ground colour with darker clusting. Underside is cream-white. The antennae of the male are bipectinated, female antennae are ciliated.

== Biology ==
Specimen of this species have been collected from sea level up to 1200m, during the whole year except September.
