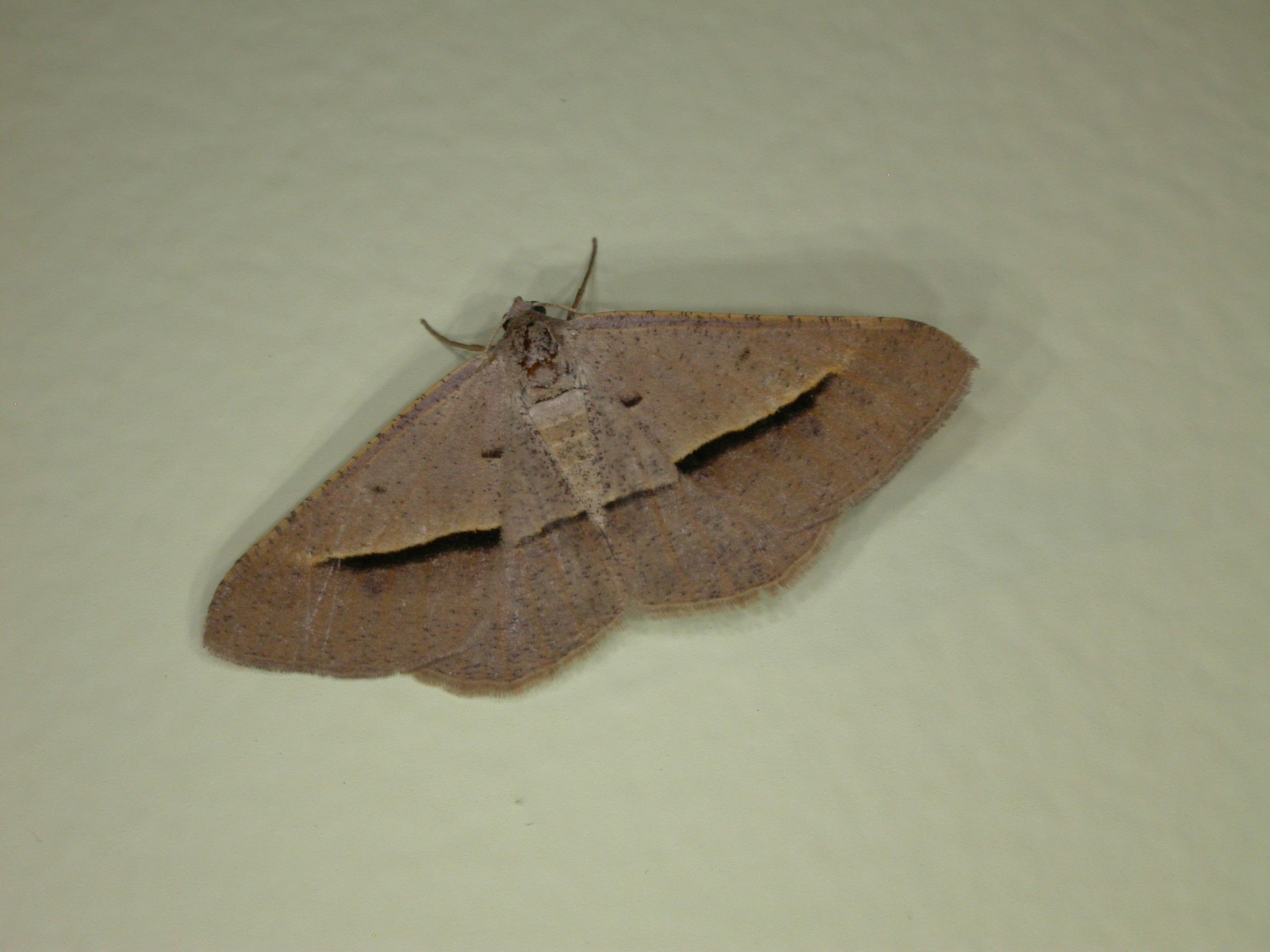

Scientific classification
- Kingdom: Animalia
- Phylum: Arthropoda
- Class: Insecta
- Order: Lepidoptera
- Family: Geometridae
- Genus: Isturgia
- Species: I. penthearia

Binomial name
- Isturgia penthearia (Guenée, 1857)

Synonyms
- Selidosema penthearia Guenée, 1857; Tephrina adustaria Walker, 1866; Panagra rupicolor Butler, 1886

= Isturgia penthearia =

Species of moth

Isturgia penthearia, the penthearia moth, is a moth of the family Geometridae. It is found in Australia.
