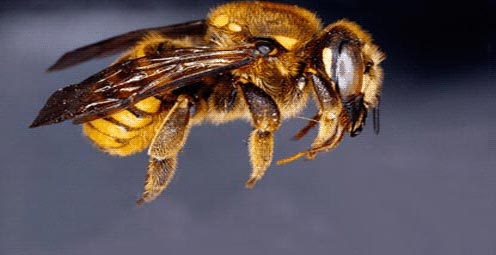
- Trachusa zebrata

Scientific classification
- Domain: Eukaryota
- Kingdom: Animalia
- Phylum: Arthropoda
- Class: Insecta
- Order: Hymenoptera
- Family: Megachilidae
- Tribe: Anthidiini
- Genus: Trachusa; Panzer, 1804

= Trachusa =

Genus of bees

Trachusa is a genus of leafcutter, mason, and resin bees in the family Megachilidae. There are at least 50 described species in Trachusa.

== Species ==
These 57 species belong to the genus Trachusa:

- Trachusa alamosana Thorp & Brooks, 1994^{i c g}
- Trachusa aquiphila (Strand, 1912)^{i c g}
- Trachusa atlantica (Benoist, 1934)^{g}
- Trachusa atoyacae (Schwarz, 1933)^{i c g}
- Trachusa autumnalis (Snelling, 1966)^{i c g}
- Trachusa baluchistanica (Mavromoustakis, 1939)^{i c g}
- Trachusa barkamensis (Wu, 1986)^{i c g}
- Trachusa bequaerti (Schwarz, 1926)^{i c g}
- Trachusa byssina (Panzer, 1798)^{i c g}
- Trachusa carinata (Wu, 1962)^{i c g}
- Trachusa catinula Brooks & Griswold, 1988^{i c g}
- Trachusa concava (Wu, 1962)^{i c g}
- Trachusa cordaticeps (Michener, 1949)^{i c g b}
- Trachusa cornopes Wu, 2004^{i c g}
- Trachusa corona Wu, 2004^{i c g}
- Trachusa crassipes (Cresson, 1878)^{i c g}
- Trachusa dorsalis (Lepeletier, 1841)^{i c g b}
- Trachusa dumerlei (Warncke, 1980)^{i c g}
- Trachusa eburneomaculata Pasteels, 1984^{i c g}
- Trachusa fasciatella (Friese, 1917)^{i c g}
- Trachusa flavorufula Pasteels, 1969^{i c g}
- Trachusa fontemvitae (Schwarz, 1926)^{i c g b}
- Trachusa forcipata (Morawitz, 1875)^{i c g}
- Trachusa formosana (Friese, 1917)^{i c g}
- Trachusa fulvopilosa Thorp & Brooks, 1994^{i c g}
- Trachusa gummifera Thorp, 1963^{i c g}
- Trachusa interdisciplinaris (Peters, 1972)^{i c g}
- Trachusa interrupta (Fabricius, 1781)^{i c g}
- Trachusa kashgarensis (Cockerell, 1911)^{i c g}
- Trachusa laeviventris (Dours, 1873)^{i c g}
- Trachusa larreae (Cockerell, 1897)^{i c g b}
- Trachusa laticeps (Morawitz, 1873)^{i c g}
- Trachusa longicornis (Friese, 1902)^{i c g}
- Trachusa ludingensis (Wu, 1992)^{i c g}
- Trachusa maai (Mavromoustakis, 1953)^{i c g}
- Trachusa manni Crawford, 1917^{i c g b}
- Trachusa massauahensis Pasteels, 1984^{i c g}
- Trachusa mitchelli (Michener, 1948)^{i c g}
- Trachusa muiri Mavromoustakis, 1936^{i c g}
- Trachusa nigrifascies Thorp & Brooks, 1994^{i c g}
- Trachusa notophila Thorp & Brooks, 1994^{i c g}
- Trachusa occidentalis (Cresson, 1868)^{i c g}
- Trachusa orientalis Pasteels, 1972^{i c g}
- Trachusa ovata (Cameron, 1902)^{i c g}
- Trachusa pectinata Brooks & Griswold, 1988^{i c g}
- Trachusa pendleburyi (Cockerell, 1927)^{i c g}
- Trachusa perdita Cockerell, 1904^{i c g b}
- Trachusa popovii (Wu, 1962)^{i c g}
- Trachusa pubescens (Morawitz, 1872)^{i c g}
- Trachusa pueblana Thorp & Brooks, 1994^{i c g}
- Trachusa ridingsii (Cresson, 1878)^{i c g}
- Trachusa rubopunctata (Wu, 1992)^{i c g}
- Trachusa rufobalteata (Cameron, 1902)^{i c g}
- Trachusa schoutedeni (Vachal, 1910)^{i c g}
- Trachusa timberlakei (Schwarz, 1928)^{i c g b}
- Trachusa xylocopiformis (Mavromoustakis, 1954)^{i c g}
- Trachusa yunnanensis (Wu, 1992)^{i c g}
- Trachusa zebrata (Cresson, 1872)^{i c g b}

Data sources: i = ITIS, c = Catalogue of Life, g = GBIF, b = Bugguide.net
