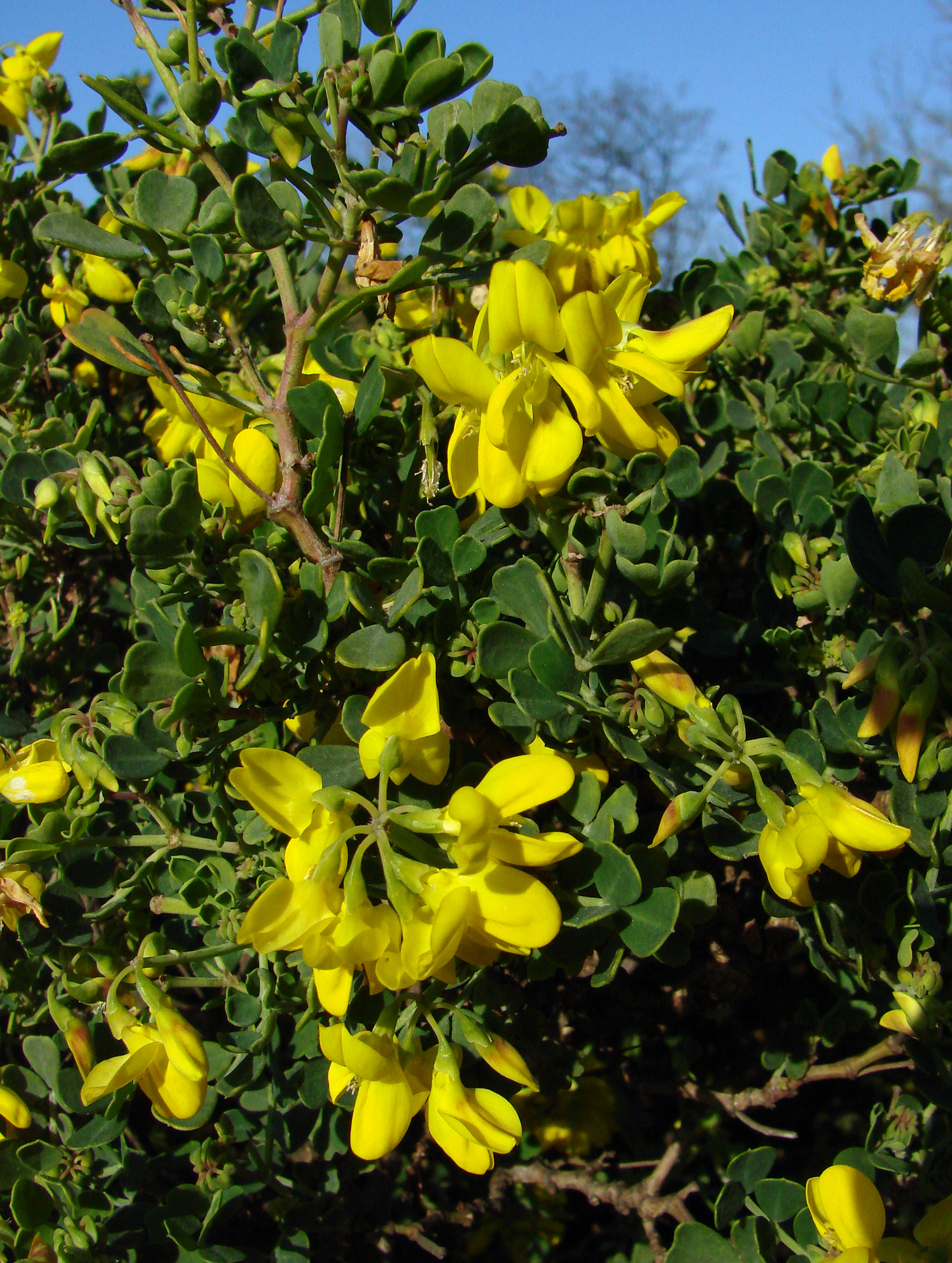
- C. valentina in Jardin des plantes, Paris

Conservation status
- Least Concern (IUCN 3.1)

Scientific classification
- Kingdom: Plantae
- Clade: Tracheophytes
- Clade: Angiosperms
- Clade: Eudicots
- Clade: Rosids
- Order: Fabales
- Family: Fabaceae
- Subfamily: Faboideae
- Genus: Coronilla
- Species: C. valentina

Binomial name
- Coronilla valentina L.

= Coronilla valentina =

Species of legume

Coronilla valentina, the shrubby scorpion-vetch,smokebush, scorpion vetch or bastard senna, is a species of flowering plant in the genus Coronilla of the legume family Fabaceae, native to the Mediterranean Basin, and introduced into Kenya and the United States. It is an evergreen shrub growing to 80 cm (31 in) tall and wide, with pea-like foliage and fragrant, brilliant yellow flowers in spring and summer, followed by slender pods. Linnaeus observed that the flowers, remarkably fragrant in the daytime, are almost scentless at night.

In cultivation it is fairly hardy, but prefers Mediterranean conditions, with shelter and warm sunshine. The subspecies C. valentina subsp. glauca (syn. C. glauca) and its cultivar 'Citrina' have gained the Royal Horticultural Society's Award of Garden Merit (confirmed 2017).
