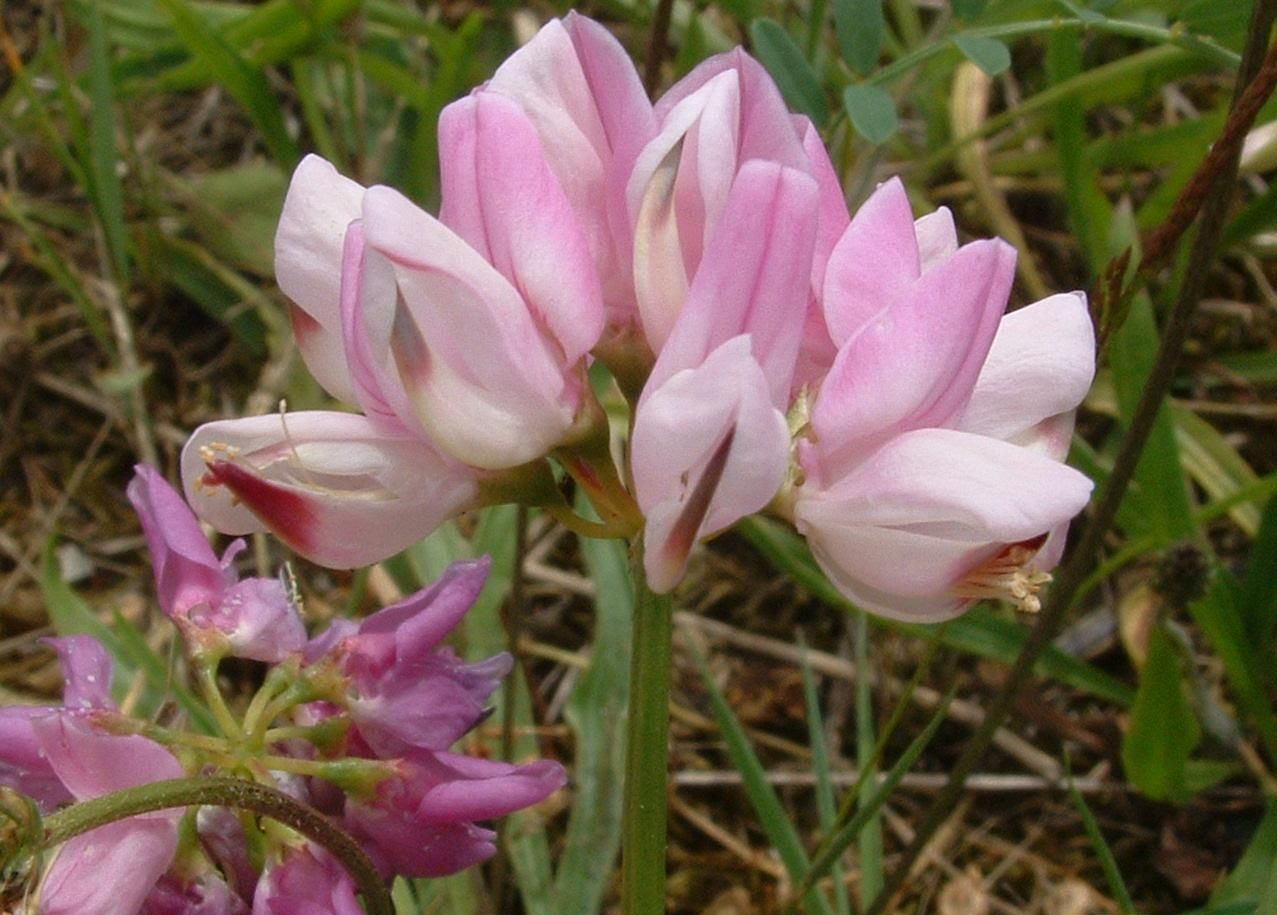
- Securigera varia

Scientific classification
- Kingdom: Plantae
- Clade: Tracheophytes
- Clade: Angiosperms
- Clade: Eudicots
- Clade: Rosids
- Order: Fabales
- Family: Fabaceae
- Subfamily: Faboideae
- Tribe: Loteae
- Genus: Securigera; DC. (1805)

Species
- See text.

Synonyms
- Bonaveria Scop.

= Securigera =

Genus of legumes

The genus Securigera contains a number of plant species commonly referred to as crownvetch. It is a segregate of the genus Coronilla. The name Securigera was first published by A. P. de Candolle in 1805 with the single species Securigera coronilla, which is now considered to be a synonym of Securigera securidaca (L.) Degen & Dörfl. (1897), based on the earlier publication of the same taxon as Coronilla securidaca L. in 1753.

== Species ==
The genus Securigera contains the following species:

- Securigera atlantica Boiss. & Reut. (Syn.: Coronilla atlantica (Boiss. & Reut.) Boiss.)
- Securigera carinata Lassen (1989)
- Securigera cretica (L.) Lassen (Syn.: Coronilla cretica L.)
- Securigera elegans (Pančič) Lassen (Syn.: Coronilla elegans Pančič)
- Securigera globosa (Lam.) Lassen (Syn.: Coronilla globosa Lam.)
- Securigera grandiflora (Boiss.) Lassen (Syn.: Coronilla grandiflora Boiss.)
- Securigera libanotica (Boiss.) Lassen (Syn.: Coronilla libanotica Boiss.)
- Securigera orientalis (Mill.) Lassen (Syn.: Coronilla balansae (Boiss.) Grossh., C. cappadocica Willd., C. cappadocica var. balansae Boiss., C. iberica Steven ex M. Bieb., C. orientalis Mill.)
- Securigera parviflora (Desv.) Lassen (Syn.: Artrolobium parviflorum Desv., Coronilla parviflora Willd., C. rostrata Boiss. & Spruner)
- Securigera securidaca (L.) Degen & Dörfl. (Syn.: Coronilla securidaca L., Securigera coronilla DC.)
- Securigera somalensis (Thulin) Lassen (Syn.: Coronilla somalensis Thulin)
- Securigera varia (L.) Lassen (Syn.: Coronilla varia L. )
