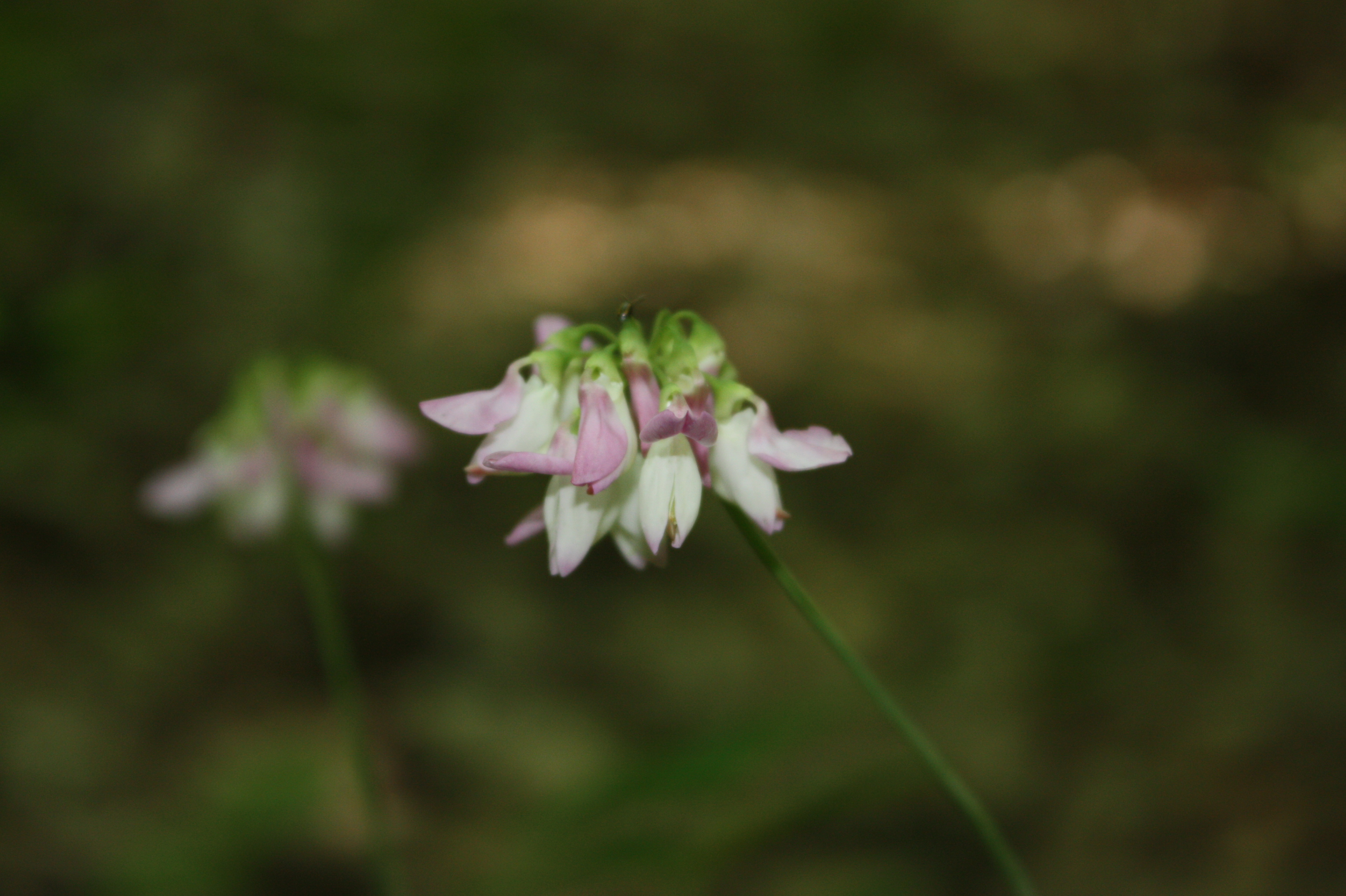

Scientific classification
- Kingdom: Plantae
- Clade: Tracheophytes
- Clade: Angiosperms
- Clade: Eudicots
- Clade: Rosids
- Order: Fabales
- Family: Fabaceae
- Subfamily: Faboideae
- Genus: Securigera
- Species: S. elegans

Binomial name
- Securigera elegans (Pancic) Lassen

Synonyms
- Coronilla elegans Pancic

= Securigera elegans =

Species of legume

Securigera elegans is a plant species in the genus Securigera.
