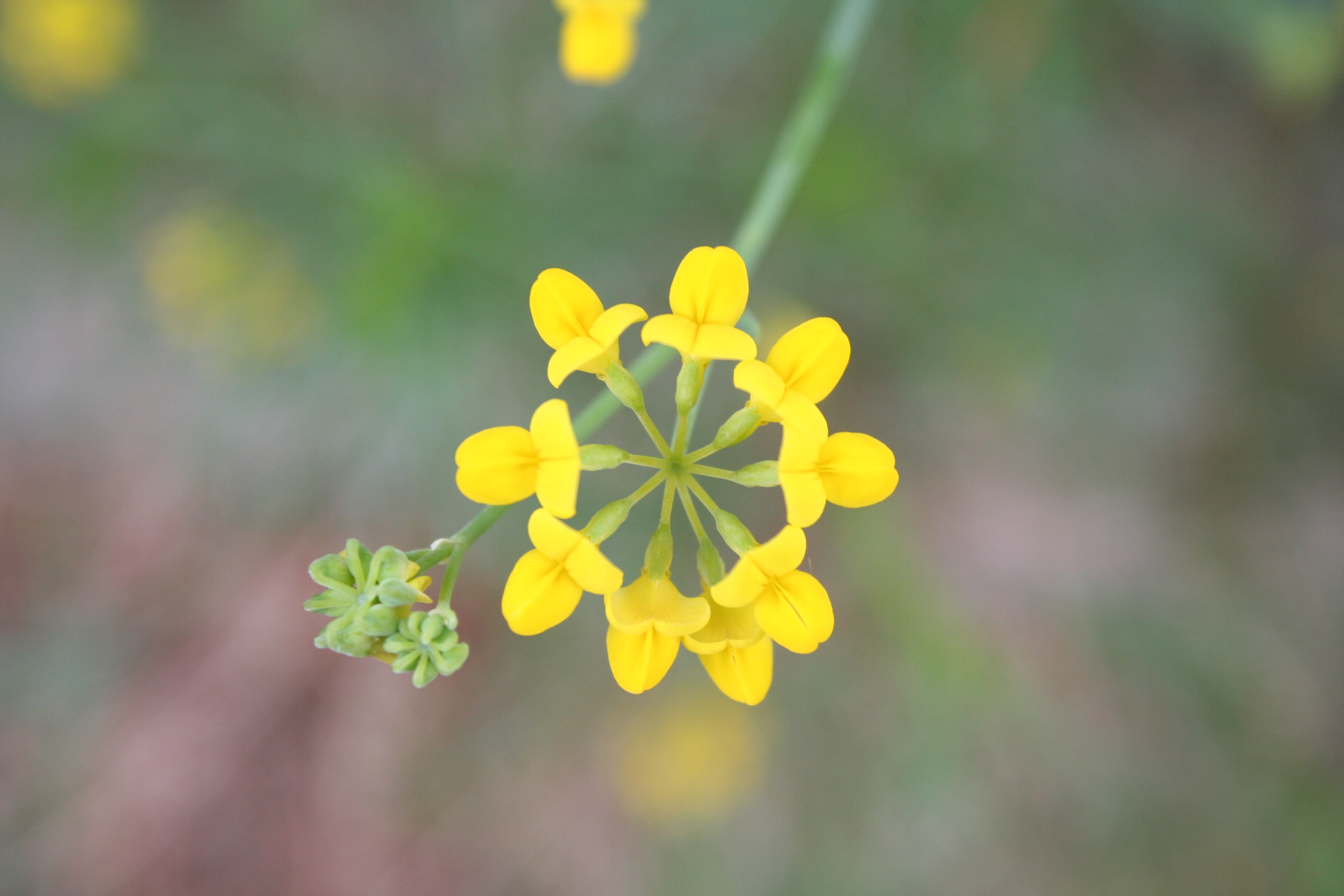
- Coronilla minima

Scientific classification
- Kingdom: Plantae
- Clade: Tracheophytes
- Clade: Angiosperms
- Clade: Eudicots
- Clade: Rosids
- Order: Fabales
- Family: Fabaceae
- Subfamily: Faboideae
- Genus: Coronilla
- Species: C. minima

Binomial name
- Coronilla minima L.

= Coronilla minima =

Species of flowering plants in the legume family Fabaceae

Coronilla minima is a species of flowering plant from the family Fabaceae found in Eastern and Central Spain.

== Description ==
The plant stems are 5–60 centimetres (2.0–23.6 in) long and are erect. Leaves grow in 2-4 pairs and are 0.8–2.2 millimetres (0.031–0.087 in) long and membranous with 1.2–20 millimetres (0.047–0.787 in) by 0.8–7 millimetres (0.031–0.276 in) long obovate and spatulate leaflets.

The plant flowers in spring when the Inflorescence carries 4-12 flowers that have a 1.5–3.5 millimetres (0.059–0.138 in) long peduncle which have ascending 0.4 millimetres (0.016 in) bracteoles and are often deciduous. Pedicels are 1–3.5 millimetres (0.039–0.138 in) long with 2–4 millimetres (0.079–0.157 in) long calyx that is glabrous. The Corolla is yellow in colour while the keels that are 4–6.5 millimetres (0.16–0.26 in) by 1.5–2.1 millimetres (0.059–0.083 in) have one awn that is 2–2.5 millimetres (0.079–0.098 in) long. The Fruits are 10–45 millimetres (0.39–1.77 in) in length and are straight, containing 1–1.1 millimetres (0.039–0.043 in) by 3–3.8 millimetres (0.12–0.15 in) transverse to ovoid seeds of a yellowish-brown colour.
