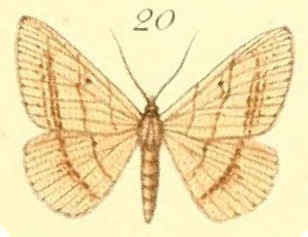

Scientific classification
- Kingdom: Animalia
- Phylum: Arthropoda
- Class: Insecta
- Order: Lepidoptera
- Family: Geometridae
- Genus: Isturgia
- Species: I. catalaunaria

Binomial name
- Isturgia catalaunaria (Guenée, 1858)

Synonyms
- Psamatodes catalaunaria Guenée, 1858; Panagra cogitata Walker, 1863; Tephrina dataria Walker, 1861; Tephrina defectaria Walker, 1861; Semiothisa largificaria Möschler, 1887; Isturgia ningwuana (Wehrli, 1940); Aspilates occupata Walker, 1862; Aspilates proxantharia Walker, 1863

= Isturgia catalaunaria =

Species of moth

Isturgia catalaunaria is a moth of the family Geometridae first described by Achille Guenée in 1858.

== Distribution ==
It is found in most countries of Africa, from Morocco and Egypt south until South Africa, in Spain and in Sri Lanka.

== Description ==
The wingspan of the male is 28 mm and the female 30 mm. Male with long antennae branches with simple shaft at extremity. Male whitish, thickly irrorated (sprinkled) and suffused with fuscous. Head orange. Forewings with nearly erect antemedial dark line. A medial band incurved below cell and often joined to the antemedial line by blotches on inner area. There is a postmedial line incurved below vein 4 and with a dark spot beyond it at middle. The marginal area suffused with purplish grey. Hindwings with sinuous medial line. Straight postmedial line present, where the area beyond it suffused with purplish fuscous. Ventral side slightly with fulvous. Bands broader, especially the postmedial. Female much similar to male, but regionally few color variations can be seen.

Larva known to feed on plants like Rhynchosia totta, Indigofera daleoides, Caesalpinia species and Delonix regia.
