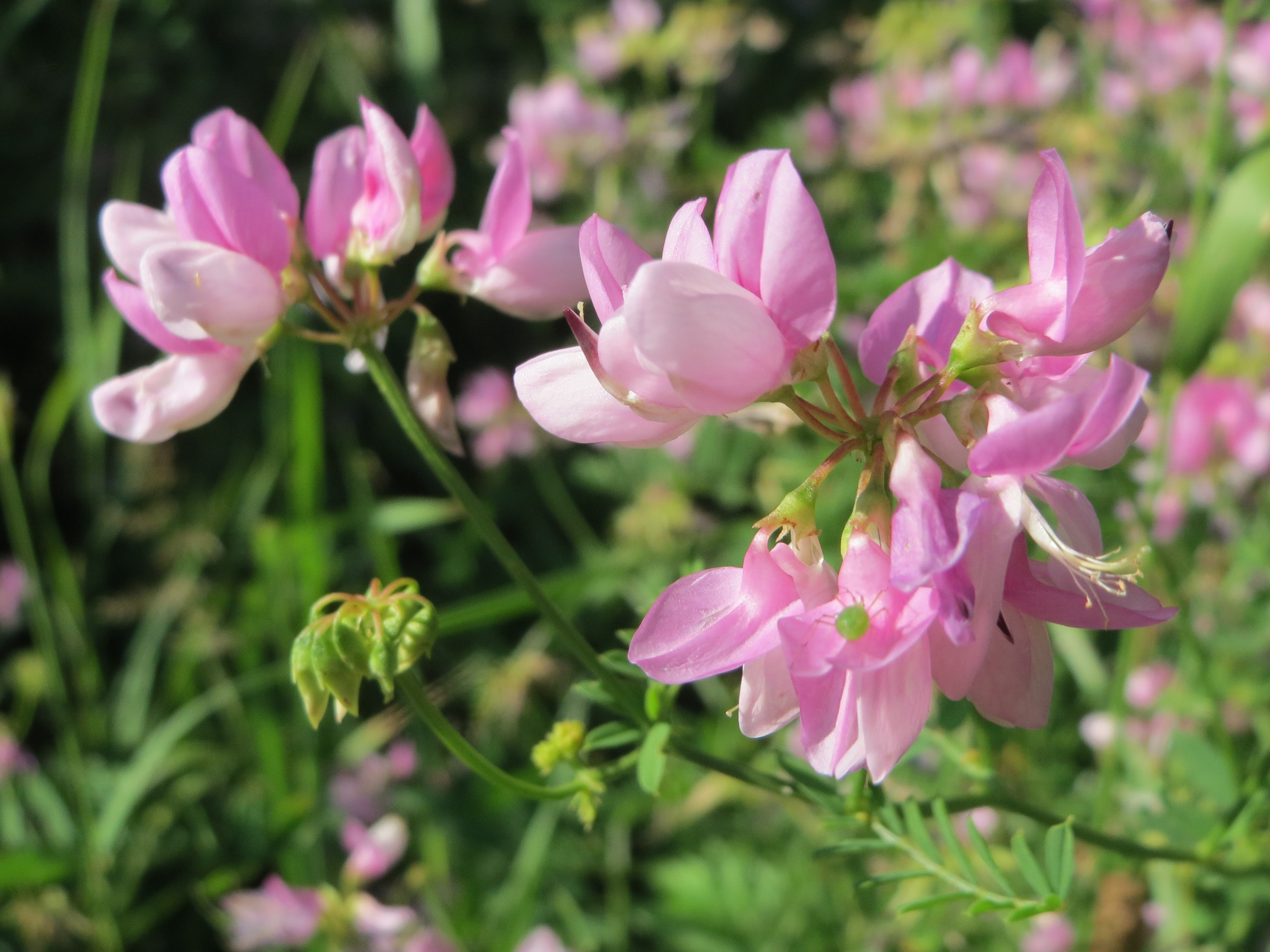
- Crownvetch in bloom

Scientific classification
- Kingdom: Plantae
- Clade: Embryophytes
- Clade: Tracheophytes
- Clade: Spermatophytes
- Clade: Angiosperms
- Clade: Eudicots
- Clade: Rosids
- Order: Fabales
- Family: Fabaceae
- Subfamily: Faboideae
- Genus: Securigera
- Species: S. varia

Binomial name
- Securigera varia (L.) Lassen

Synonyms
- Coronilla haussknechtii Boiss.; Coronilla hirta Boiss.; Coronilla varia L.

= Securigera varia =

Crownvetch

Species of legume

Securigera varia (synonym Coronilla varia), commonly known as crownvetch or purple crown vetch, is a low-growing legume vine. It is native to Africa, Asia and Europe and is commonly used throughout the United States and Canada for erosion control, roadside planting and soil rehabilitation. It has become an invasive species in many states of the US.

Crownvetch grows 1 to 2 feet (0.30 to 0.61 m) feet tall and bears small clusters of 1/2 inch (13 mm) pink and white flowers from early summer to late fall. The variety Penngift produces mounds of pink flowers. Crownvetch is a tough, aggressive spreading plant that will crowd out its neighbors in a show garden but is well suited to a sunny bank, where it will grow for decades with little to no fertilizing, mowing, or weeding since the thick foliage prevents other weeds. Its deep, tenacious, complex root system and thick, fern-like leaves provide excellent erosion control where it is used as a ground cover. However, this legume has a very long germination period of about 6 months and does not create full coverage until two or three years later.

== Taxonomy ==
Securigera varia was given its first scientific description in 1753 by Carl Linnaeus with the name Coronilla varia. In 1989 Per Lassen proposed moving it to the genus Securigera, which had been created by Augustin Pyramus de Candolle in 1805.

As of 2024 the correct classification of the species is uncertain. In databases like Plants of the World Online, World Flora Online, and the Legume Data Portal, Coronilla varia is listed as the accepted name. On the other hand Securigera varia is listed as the accepted name in resources such as Flora of the Southeastern United States, World Plants, and the New Zealand Organisms Register.

== Forage ==
Crownvetch is toxic to horses and other non-ruminants because of the presence of nitroglycosides. If consumed in large amounts, it can stunt growth, or even lead to paralysis and death. However, this is not true for ruminant animals such as cattle, goats, and sheep. These aliphatic nitro compounds are degraded in ruminant digestion and do not affect the animals.

Crownvetch was originally labeled as a poor forage for farm animals but more recently it has been deemed as a good forage when fed as hay to or grazed by ruminants. It consists of 21.7% crude protein and 22.2% crude fibre. In an experiment involving the digestibility of crownvetch in sheep, it was found that the crude protein is 65.6% and the crude fibre is 46.2% digestible which is similar, but slightly less than the digestibility of alfalfa forage. As previously mentioned, this only applies to ruminant animals as it is toxic to non-ruminants.

Crownvetch has been identified as an invasive in several midwestern states. It is very hard to eradicate once established.

It is also a common host-plant for the moth Zygaena ephialtes.

== Gallery ==
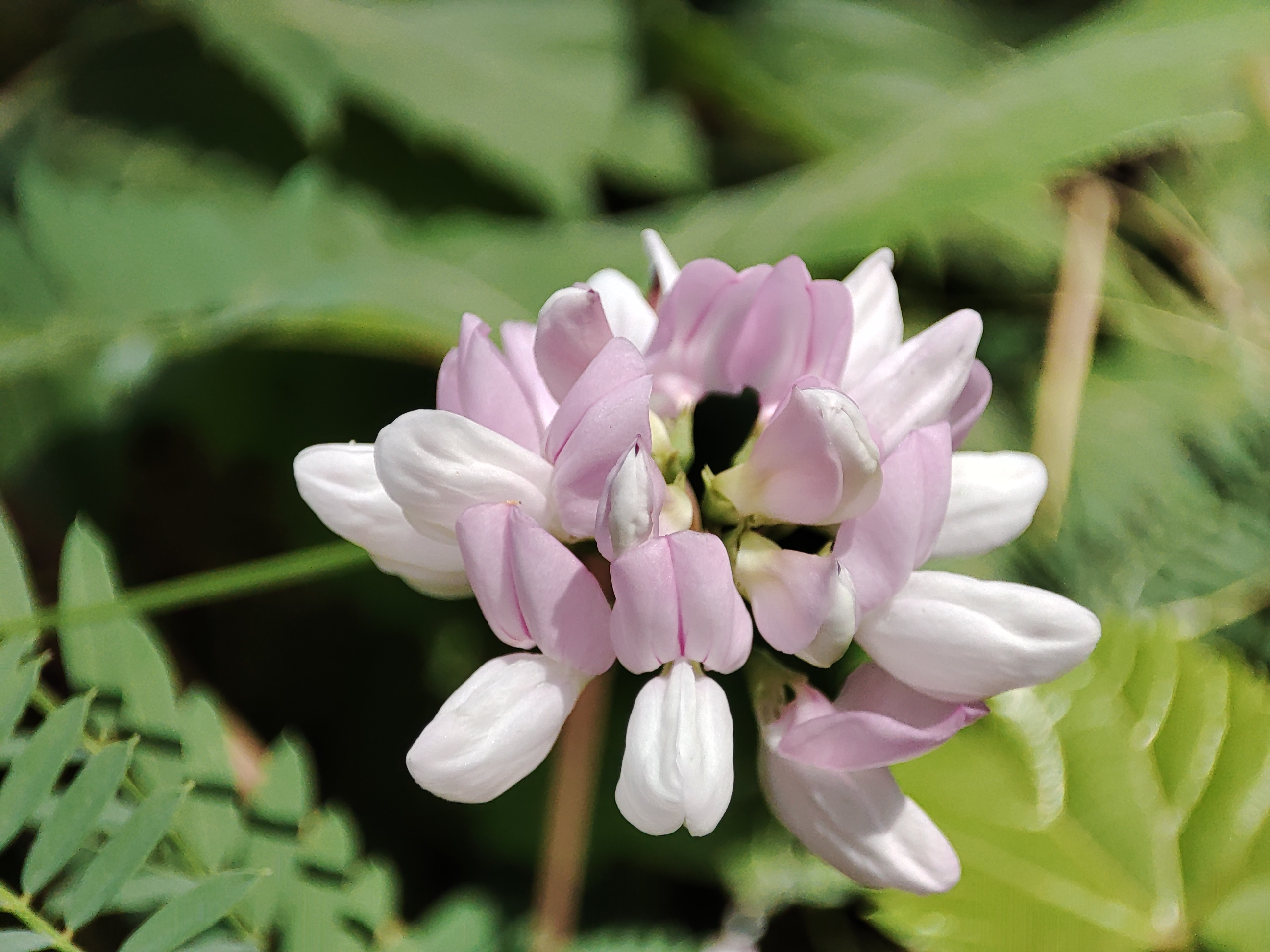
Crownvetch

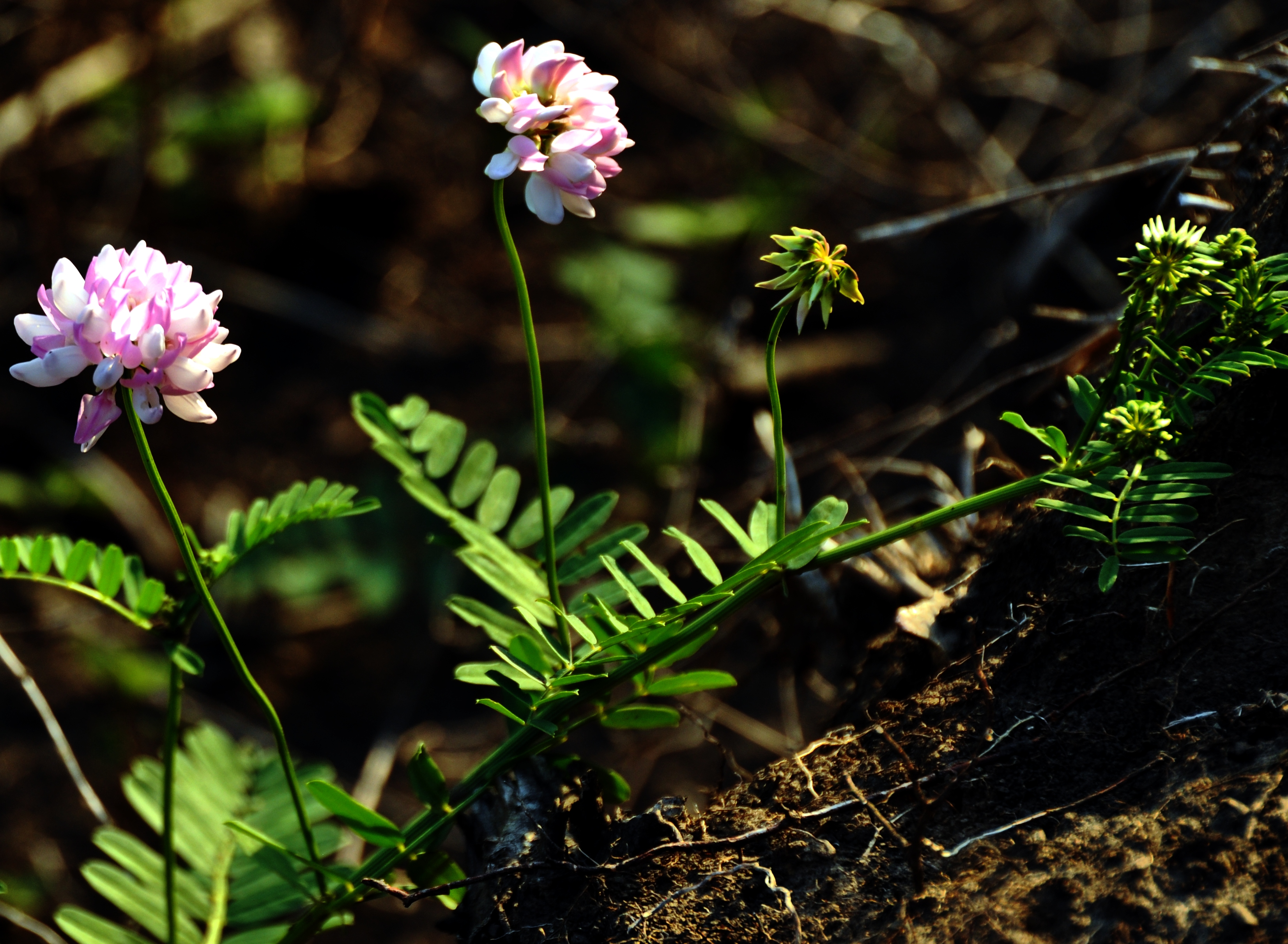
Crownvetch planted to prevent erosion

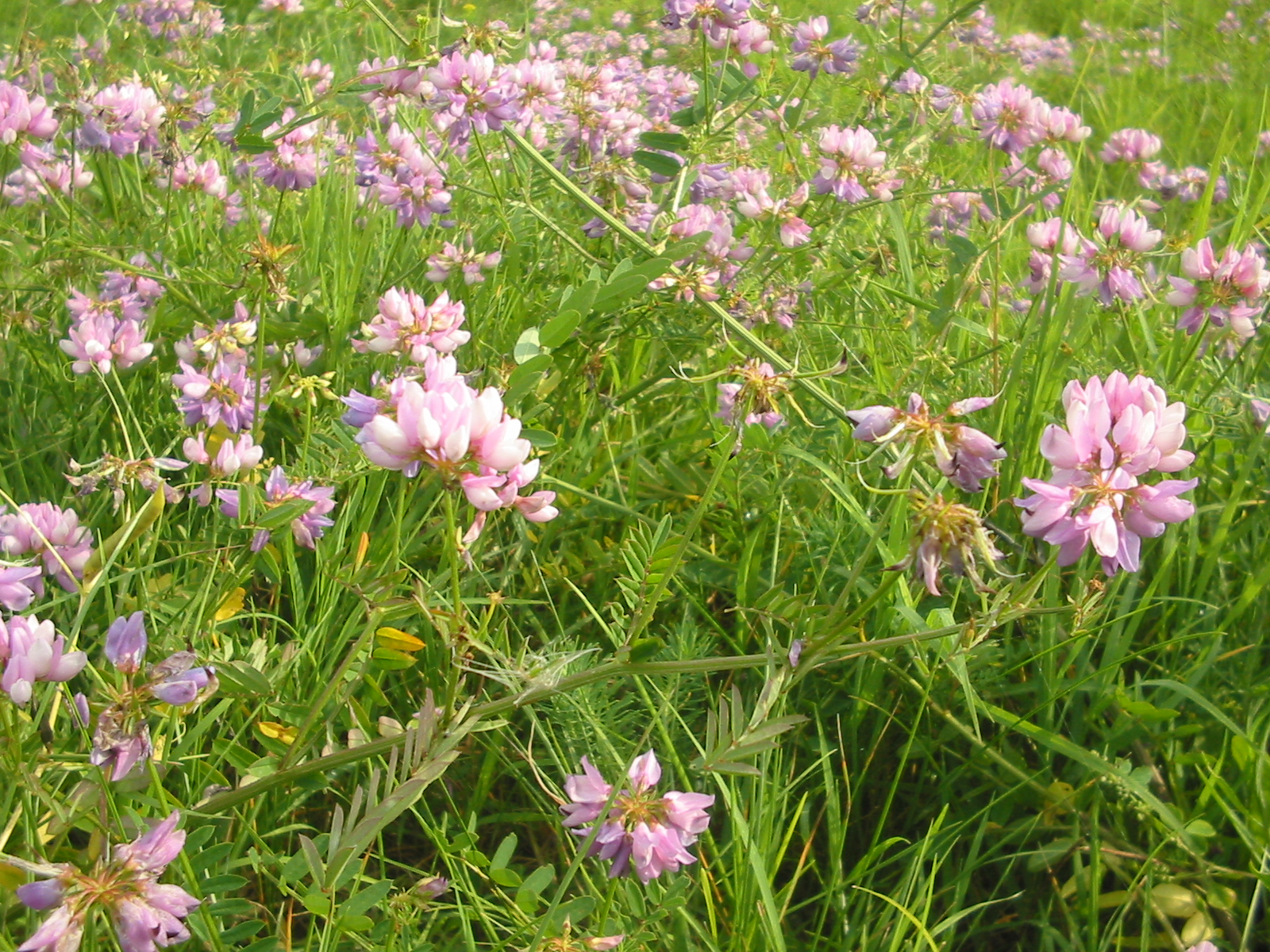
A field with crownvetch
