= Sirota =

Sirota, Sierota, Sirotta, Serota, or Syrota (Cyrillic: Сирота) is a gender-neutral Slavic surname meaning orphan. Notable people with the surname include:

- Alexander Sirota (born 1976), Ukrainian photographer
- Beate Sirota (1923–2012), American performing arts director
- Beatrice Serota, Baroness Serota (1919–2002), British minister
- Benny Sirota, one of the founders of the Troika Pottery
- David Sirota (born 1975), American writer
- Emily Sirota (born 1979), American politician
- Gershon Sirota (1874–1943), Ukrainian chazan
- Ian Sirota, Canadian comedian
- Leo Sirota (1885–1965), Ukrainian pianist
- Louanne Sirota (born 1970), American actress
- Lyubov Sirota (born 1956), Ukrainian writer
- Milton Sirotta (1911–1981), American who coined the word "googol"
- Nadia Sirota, American violist
- Nicholas Serota (born 1946), British art historian
- Nick Sirota (born 1984), American ice hockey player
- Robert Sirota (born 1949), American musician
- Ruslan Sirota (born 1980), Ukrainian musician
- Oleksandr Syrota (born 2000), Ukrainian footballer
- Sasha Sirota, American musician
- Sierota siblings, members of American indie band Echosmith
- Sydney Sierota, American musician
- Svyatoslav Syrota (born 1970), Ukrainian football player and administrator

Sirota or Serota may also refer to:

- Sir Nicholas Serota Makes an Acquisitions Decision, painting of the stuckism art movement
- Ephysteris sirota, species of moth
- Bloc Borys Olijnyk and Myhailo Syrota, Ukrainian political alliance
