= Ochrodia =

Scientific classification
- Kingdom: Animalia
- Phylum: Arthropoda
- Clade: Pancrustacea
- Class: Insecta
- Order: Lepidoptera
- Family: Gelechiidae
- Tribe: Gnorimoschemini
- Genus: Ochrodia; Povolný, 1966

Genus of moths

Ochrodia is a genus of moth in the family Gelechiidae. Although considered valid in most modern sources, it is sometimes listed as a synonym of Ephysteris.

== Species ==
- Ochrodia pentamacula (Janse, 1958)
- Ochrodia subdiminutella (Stainton, 1867)
