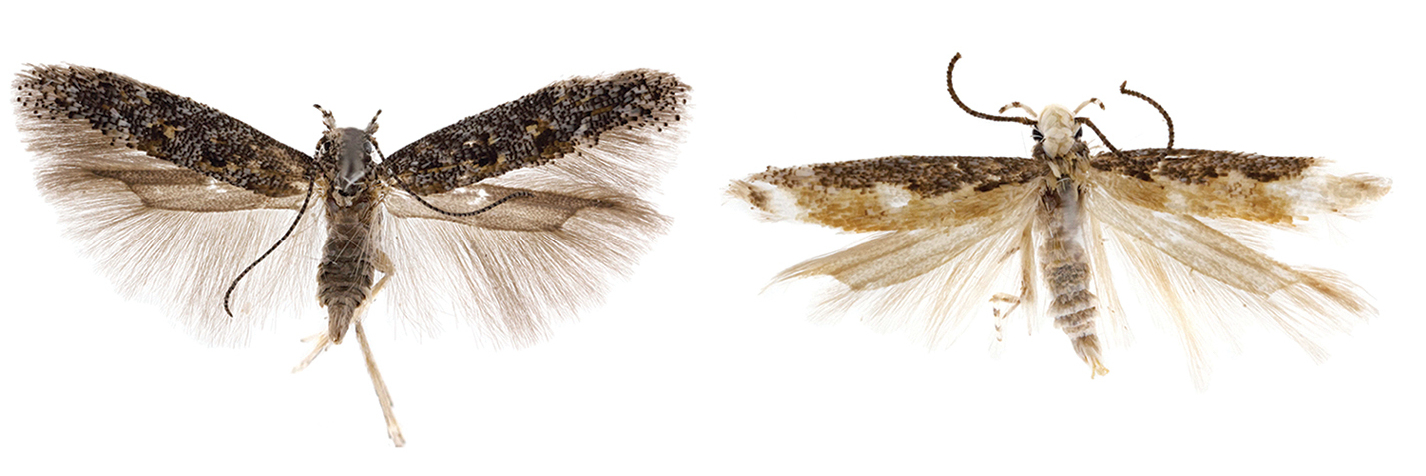
- Neopalpa neonata (left) and Neopalpa donaldtrumpi (right)

Scientific classification
- Kingdom: Animalia
- Phylum: Arthropoda
- Clade: Pancrustacea
- Class: Insecta
- Order: Lepidoptera
- Family: Gelechiidae
- Tribe: Gnorimoschemini
- Genus: Neopalpa; Povolný, 1998

Species
- Two, see text
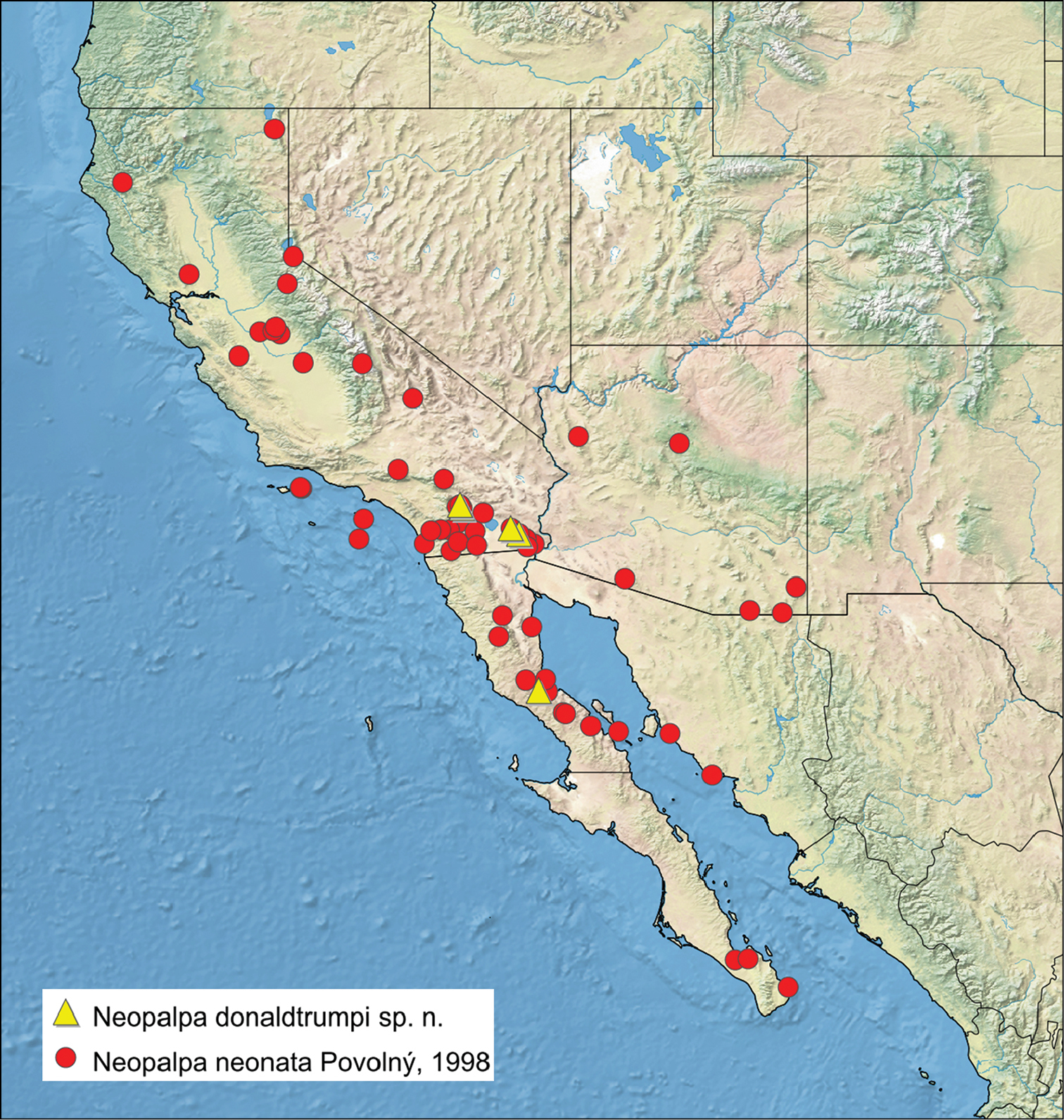
- Distribution of N. neonata (red dots) and N. donaldtrumpi (yellow triangles)

= Neopalpa =

Genus of moths

Neopalpa is a genus of moths in the family Gelechiidae. They are found in California, Arizona, and northern Mexico. Neopalpa is classified in the tribe Gnorimoschemini and is most closely related to the genera Ochrodia and Ephysteris.

== Species ==
The genus contains the following two species:

- Neopalpa donaldtrumpi
- Neopalpa neonata
