= Ephysteris wenquana =

Scientific classification
- Domain: Eukaryota
- Kingdom: Animalia
- Phylum: Arthropoda
- Class: Insecta
- Order: Lepidoptera
- Family: Gelechiidae
- Genus: Ephysteris
- Species: E. wenquana

Binomial name
- Ephysteris wenquana H.H.Li & Bidzilya, 2008

Species of moth

Ephysteris wenquana is a moth in the family Gelechiidae. It was described by H.H.Li and Bidzilya in 2008. It is found in Yunnan, China.

The length of the forewings is 4-4.5 mm. Adults are on wing in August.

== Etymology ==
The species name refers to Wenquan, the type locality.
