= Ephysteris aulacopis =

Scientific classification
- Kingdom: Animalia
- Phylum: Arthropoda
- Class: Insecta
- Order: Lepidoptera
- Family: Gelechiidae
- Genus: Ephysteris
- Species: E. aulacopis

Binomial name
- Ephysteris aulacopis (Meyrick, 1923)

Synonyms
- Aristotelia aulacopis Meyrick, 1923; Aristotelia oxythectis Meyrick, 1929; Ephysteris dierli Povolný, 1968

Species of moth

Ephysteris aulacopis is a moth in the family Gelechiidae. It was described by Edward Meyrick in 1923. It is found in Nepal and Assam, India.

The wingspan is 10–11 mm. The forewings are pale grey speckled with dark fuscous, suffusedly streaked with ochreous brown between the veins, and with a few black specks posteriorly. The stigmata are black, the plical obliquely before the first discal. The hindwings are grey.
