= Ephysteris subovata =

Scientific classification
- Kingdom: Animalia
- Phylum: Arthropoda
- Clade: Pancrustacea
- Class: Insecta
- Order: Lepidoptera
- Family: Gelechiidae
- Genus: Ephysteris
- Species: E. subovata

Binomial name
- Ephysteris subovata (Povolný, 2001)

Synonyms
- Microcraspedus subovatus Povolný, 2001; Ephysteris subovatus

Species of moth

Ephysteris subovata is a moth in the family Gelechiidae. It was described by Povolný in 2001. It is found in Transbaikalia and China (Jilin, Gansu, Hebei, Ningxia, Shaanxi, Tianjin).

The length of the forewings is 5–6 mm. Adults are on wing from June to August in China.
