= Ephysteris eremaula =

Scientific classification
- Domain: Eukaryota
- Kingdom: Animalia
- Phylum: Arthropoda
- Class: Insecta
- Order: Lepidoptera
- Family: Gelechiidae
- Genus: Ephysteris
- Species: E. eremaula

Binomial name
- Ephysteris eremaula (Janse, 1960)

Synonyms
- Microcraspedus eremaula Janse, 1960

Species of moth

Ephysteris eremaula is a moth in the family Gelechiidae. It was described by Anthonie Johannes Theodorus Janse in 1960. It is found in Namibia and South Africa.
