= Ephysteris juvenilis =

Scientific classification
- Kingdom: Animalia
- Phylum: Arthropoda
- Class: Insecta
- Order: Lepidoptera
- Family: Gelechiidae
- Genus: Ephysteris
- Species: E. juvenilis

Binomial name
- Ephysteris juvenilis (Meyrick, 1929)

Synonyms
- Aristotelia juvenilis Meyrick, 1929

Species of moth

Ephysteris juvenilis is a moth in the family Gelechiidae. It was described by Edward Meyrick in 1929. It is found in Assam, India.
