= Ephysteris brachypogon =

Scientific classification
- Kingdom: Animalia
- Phylum: Arthropoda
- Class: Insecta
- Order: Lepidoptera
- Family: Gelechiidae
- Genus: Ephysteris
- Species: E. brachypogon

Binomial name
- Ephysteris brachypogon (Meyrick, 1937)

Synonyms
- Megacraspedus brachypogon Meyrick, 1937

Species of moth

Ephysteris brachypogon is a moth in the family Gelechiidae. It was described by Edward Meyrick in 1937. It is found in South Africa.
