= Ephysteris silignitis =

Scientific classification
- Domain: Eukaryota
- Kingdom: Animalia
- Phylum: Arthropoda
- Class: Insecta
- Order: Lepidoptera
- Family: Gelechiidae
- Genus: Ephysteris
- Species: E. silignitis

Binomial name
- Ephysteris silignitis (Turner, 1919)

Synonyms
- Phtyorimaea silignitis Turner, 1919; Megacraspedus coniogramma Meyrick, 1921

Species of moth

Ephysteris silignitis is a moth in the family Gelechiidae. It was described by Alfred Jefferis Turner in 1919. It is found in Australia, where it has been recorded from Queensland.

The wingspan is 10–11 mm. The forewings are whitish-ochreous, with more or less indicated lines of blackish-grey irroration between the veins. The stigmata are dark fuscous, the plical rather obliquely beyond the first discal and the second discal rather below the middle. The hindwings are pale grey.
