= Ephysteris flavida =

Scientific classification
- Kingdom: Animalia
- Phylum: Arthropoda
- Clade: Pancrustacea
- Class: Insecta
- Order: Lepidoptera
- Family: Gelechiidae
- Genus: Ephysteris
- Species: E. flavida

Binomial name
- Ephysteris flavida Povolný, 1969

Species of moth

Ephysteris flavida is a moth in the family Gelechiidae. It was described by Povolný in 1969. It is found in Mongolia, Iran and China (Inner Mongolia, Xinjiang)

The length of the forewings is 3.9–5 mm. Adults are on wing in August in China.
