= Ephysteris speciosa =

Scientific classification
- Kingdom: Animalia
- Phylum: Arthropoda
- Clade: Pancrustacea
- Class: Insecta
- Order: Lepidoptera
- Family: Gelechiidae
- Genus: Ephysteris
- Species: E. speciosa

Binomial name
- Ephysteris speciosa Povolný, 1977

Synonyms
- Ephysteris (Opacopsis) speciosa Povolný, 1977

Species of moth

Ephysteris speciosa is a moth in the family Gelechiidae. It was described by Povolný in 1977. It is found in north-eastern Iran.
