= Ephysteris montana =

Scientific classification
- Domain: Eukaryota
- Kingdom: Animalia
- Phylum: Arthropoda
- Class: Insecta
- Order: Lepidoptera
- Family: Gelechiidae
- Genus: Ephysteris
- Species: E. montana

Binomial name
- Ephysteris montana H.H.Li & Bidzilya, 2008

Species of moth

Ephysteris montana is a moth in the family Gelechiidae. It was described by H.H.Li and Bidzilya in 2008. It is found in China (Sichuan).

The length of the forewings is 4–5 mm. Adults are on wing in mid-July.

== Etymology ==
The species name refers to the species distribution in high mountains and is derived from Latin montanus (meaning mountainous).
