= Ephysteris ruth =

Scientific classification
- Kingdom: Animalia
- Phylum: Arthropoda
- Clade: Pancrustacea
- Class: Insecta
- Order: Lepidoptera
- Family: Gelechiidae
- Genus: Ephysteris
- Species: E. ruth

Binomial name
- Ephysteris ruth Povolný, 1977

Synonyms
- Ephysteris (Opacopsis) ruth Povolný, 1977

Species of moth

Ephysteris ruth is a moth in the family Gelechiidae. It was described by Povolný in 1977. It is found in Iran.
