= Ephysteris parasynecta =

Scientific classification
- Domain: Eukaryota
- Kingdom: Animalia
- Phylum: Arthropoda
- Class: Insecta
- Order: Lepidoptera
- Family: Gelechiidae
- Genus: Ephysteris
- Species: E. parasynecta

Binomial name
- Ephysteris parasynecta Janse, 1963

Species of moth

Ephysteris parasynecta is a moth in the family Gelechiidae. It was described by Anthonie Johannes Theodorus Janse in 1963. It is found in South Africa.
