= Ephysteris unica =

Scientific classification
- Kingdom: Animalia
- Phylum: Arthropoda
- Clade: Pancrustacea
- Class: Insecta
- Order: Lepidoptera
- Family: Gelechiidae
- Genus: Ephysteris
- Species: E. unica

Binomial name
- Ephysteris unica Povolný, 1971

Synonyms
- Ephysteris (Opacopsis) unica Povolný, 1971

Species of moth

Ephysteris unica is a moth in the family Gelechiidae. It was described by Dalibor Povolný in 1971. It is found in Algeria.

The length of the forewings is 4.5–6 mm (0.18–0.24 in).
