= Ephysteris insulella =

Scientific classification
- Kingdom: Animalia
- Phylum: Arthropoda
- Clade: Pancrustacea
- Class: Insecta
- Order: Lepidoptera
- Family: Gelechiidae
- Genus: Ephysteris
- Species: E. insulella

Binomial name
- Ephysteris insulella (Heinemann, 1870)

Synonyms
- Lita insulella Heinemann, 1870; Gelechia insularis Staudinger, 1871; Opacopsis gallica Povolný, 1992; Doryphora praticolella Christoph, 1872

Species of moth

Ephysteris insulella is a moth in the family Gelechiidae. It was described by Hermann von Heinemann in 1870. It is found in France, Germany, Switzerland, Italy, Bulgaria, Romania and Russia. Outside of Europe, it is found in south-eastern Kazakhstan, southern Siberia, Mongolia and China (Inner Mongolia, Xinjiang).

The length of the forewings is 7–8 mm. Adults are on wing from July to August.

== Subspecies ==
- Ephysteris insulella insulella
- Ephysteris insulella praticolella (Christoph, 1872) (Italy, Balkans, south-western Russia, Tuva)
