= Ephysteris promptella =

Scientific classification
- Kingdom: Animalia
- Phylum: Arthropoda
- Clade: Pancrustacea
- Class: Insecta
- Order: Lepidoptera
- Family: Gelechiidae
- Genus: Ephysteris
- Species: E. promptella

Binomial name
- Ephysteris promptella (Staudinger, 1859)

Synonyms
- Gelechia promptella Staudinger, 1859; Epithectis petiginella Mann, 1867; Ephysteris petiginella; Ephysteris promptella australiae Povolny 1977; Aristotelia cacomicra Walsingham 1907; Ephysteris chersaea Meyrick, 1908; ?Epiphthora crystallista Meyrick, 1911; Phthorimaea dispensata Meyrick 1921; Ephysteris oschophora Meyrick 1910; Metzneria xanthorhabda Gozmany 1951; Doryphora parvula Staudinger, 1879; Phthorimaea fanatica Meyrick, 1921; Ephysteris despectella Walker, 1863

Species of moth

Ephysteris promptella, the ratoon shootborer, is a moth of the family Gelechiidae. It is a pantropical species, found in the warmer parts of the Old World tropics to Australia. It is widely distributed in southern Europe (ranging to Slovakia in the north).

The wingspan is 8–10 mm. Adults are greyish brown.

The larvae feed on Andropogon, Oryza, Panicum, Saccharum officinarum, Sorghum, Stipa, Triticum and Zea mays. They bore the shoots of their host plant. Full-grown larvae reach a length of about 5 mm.
