= Ephysteris longicornis =

Scientific classification
- Domain: Eukaryota
- Kingdom: Animalia
- Phylum: Arthropoda
- Class: Insecta
- Order: Lepidoptera
- Family: Gelechiidae
- Genus: Ephysteris
- Species: E. longicornis

Binomial name
- Ephysteris longicornis J. F. G. Clarke, 1986

Species of moth

Ephysteris longicornis is a moth in the family Gelechiidae. It was described by John Frederick Gates Clarke in 1986. It is found on the Marquesas Archipelago in French Polynesia.
