= Ephysteris semiophanes =

Scientific classification
- Kingdom: Animalia
- Phylum: Arthropoda
- Class: Insecta
- Order: Lepidoptera
- Family: Gelechiidae
- Genus: Ephysteris
- Species: E. semiophanes

Binomial name
- Ephysteris semiophanes (Meyrick, 1918)

Synonyms
- Aristotelia semiophanes Meyrick, 1918

Species of moth

Ephysteris semiophanes is a moth in the family Gelechiidae. It was described by Edward Meyrick in 1918. It is found in Sri Lanka.

The wingspan is about 11 mm. The forewings are brown irrorated (sprinkled) with dark fuscous with a broad deep yellow-ochreous dorsal stripe from the base, the upper edge indented on the plical stigma, beyond this forming a rounded blotch extending to the discal stigmata, then much narrowed to beyond the tornus, including irregular longitudinal silvery marks towards the base and beyond the middle, and a dot on the tornus. There is an oblique fascia of silvery suffusion at one-fourth and a patch towards the middle of the costa. The stigmata are small, indistinct and dark fuscous, the plical obliquely before the first discal, both these followed by small white dots, the second discal is preceded by a small white dot and surmounted by a small yellow-ochreous spot. A small yellow-ochreous spot is located beneath the costa towards the apex, and some suffusion is found along the termen. There are also some small cloudy white marginal dots around the posterior part of the costa and termen. The hindwings are grey.
