= Ephysteris scimitarella =

Scientific classification
- Kingdom: Animalia
- Phylum: Arthropoda
- Clade: Pancrustacea
- Class: Insecta
- Order: Lepidoptera
- Family: Gelechiidae
- Genus: Ephysteris
- Species: E. scimitarella

Binomial name
- Ephysteris scimitarella Landry, 2010

Species of moth

Ephysteris scimitarella is a moth in the family Gelechiidae. It was described by Bernard Landry in 2010. It is found on the Galápagos Islands.

The length of the forewings is 4.2-4.7 mm. Adults have been recorded on wing in February, March and May.
