= Ephysteris ornata =

Scientific classification
- Domain: Eukaryota
- Kingdom: Animalia
- Phylum: Arthropoda
- Class: Insecta
- Order: Lepidoptera
- Family: Gelechiidae
- Genus: Ephysteris
- Species: E. ornata

Binomial name
- Ephysteris ornata (Janse, 1950)

Synonyms
- Aristotelia ornata Janse, 1950

Species of moth

Ephysteris ornata is a moth in the family Gelechiidae. It was described by Anthonie Johannes Theodorus Janse in 1950. It is found in Namibia and the South African province of Gauteng.

The larvae feed on Osteospermum muricatum.
