= Ephysteris brachyptera =

Scientific classification
- Kingdom: Animalia
- Phylum: Arthropoda
- Clade: Pancrustacea
- Class: Insecta
- Order: Lepidoptera
- Family: Gelechiidae
- Genus: Ephysteris
- Species: E. brachyptera

Binomial name
- Ephysteris brachyptera Karsholt & Sattler, 1998

Species of moth

Ephysteris brachyptera is a moth in the family Gelechiidae. It was described by Ole Karsholt and Klaus Siegfried Oskar Sattler in 1998. It is found on Madeira, in the north Atlantic Ocean, southwest of Portugal.
