= Ephysteris cyrenaica =

Scientific classification
- Kingdom: Animalia
- Phylum: Arthropoda
- Clade: Pancrustacea
- Class: Insecta
- Order: Lepidoptera
- Family: Gelechiidae
- Genus: Ephysteris
- Species: E. cyrenaica

Binomial name
- Ephysteris cyrenaica Povolný, 1981

Synonyms
- Ephysteris (Opacopsis) cyrenaica Povolný, 1981

Species of moth

Ephysteris cyrenaica is a moth in the family Gelechiidae. It was described by Povolný in 1981. It is found in Libya.
