= Ephysteris iberica =

Scientific classification
- Kingdom: Animalia
- Phylum: Arthropoda
- Clade: Pancrustacea
- Class: Insecta
- Order: Lepidoptera
- Family: Gelechiidae
- Genus: Ephysteris
- Species: E. iberica

Binomial name
- Ephysteris iberica Povolný, [1977]

Species of moth

Ephysteris iberica is a moth of the family Gelechiidae. It was described by Povolný in 1977. It is found in Croatia, Greece, France, Spain and on Sicily and Malta. Outside of Europe, it has been recorded from Israel.
