= Ephysteris olympica =

Scientific classification
- Kingdom: Animalia
- Phylum: Arthropoda
- Clade: Pancrustacea
- Class: Insecta
- Order: Lepidoptera
- Family: Gelechiidae
- Genus: Ephysteris
- Species: E. olympica

Binomial name
- Ephysteris olympica Povolný, 1968

Synonyms
- Ephysteris (Opacopsis) olympica Povolný, 1968; Ephysteris (Opacopsis) monticola Povolný, 1981

Species of moth

Ephysteris olympica is a moth in the family Gelechiidae. It was described by Povolný in 1968. It is found in southern France (the Pyrenees and western Alps) and Greece.
