= Ephysteris curtipennis =

Scientific classification
- Domain: Eukaryota
- Kingdom: Animalia
- Phylum: Arthropoda
- Class: Insecta
- Order: Lepidoptera
- Family: Gelechiidae
- Genus: Ephysteris
- Species: E. curtipennis

Binomial name
- Ephysteris curtipennis (Zerny, 1935)

Synonyms
- Phthorimaea curtipennis Zerny, 1935

Species of moth

Ephysteris curtipennis is a moth in the family Gelechiidae. It was described by Hans Zerny in 1935. It is found in Morocco.
