= Ephysteris trinota =

Scientific classification
- Domain: Eukaryota
- Kingdom: Animalia
- Phylum: Arthropoda
- Class: Insecta
- Order: Lepidoptera
- Family: Gelechiidae
- Genus: Ephysteris
- Species: E. trinota

Binomial name
- Ephysteris trinota (Clarke, 1965)

Synonyms
- Echinoglossa trinota Clarke, 1965

Species of moth

Ephysteris trinota is a moth in the family Gelechiidae. It was described by Clarke in 1965. It is found on the Galapagos Islands.

The wingspan is 9–10 mm. The forewings are cinereous, with the base of the costa narrowly fuscous. The stigmata are fuscous and there is a series of ill-defined small fuscous spots on the outer third of the costa, around the apex and along the termen. The apical third of the wing has scattered ochreous scales. The hindwings are grey.
