= Palace of Culture Energetik =

Abandoned palace of culture in Ukraine

Energetik
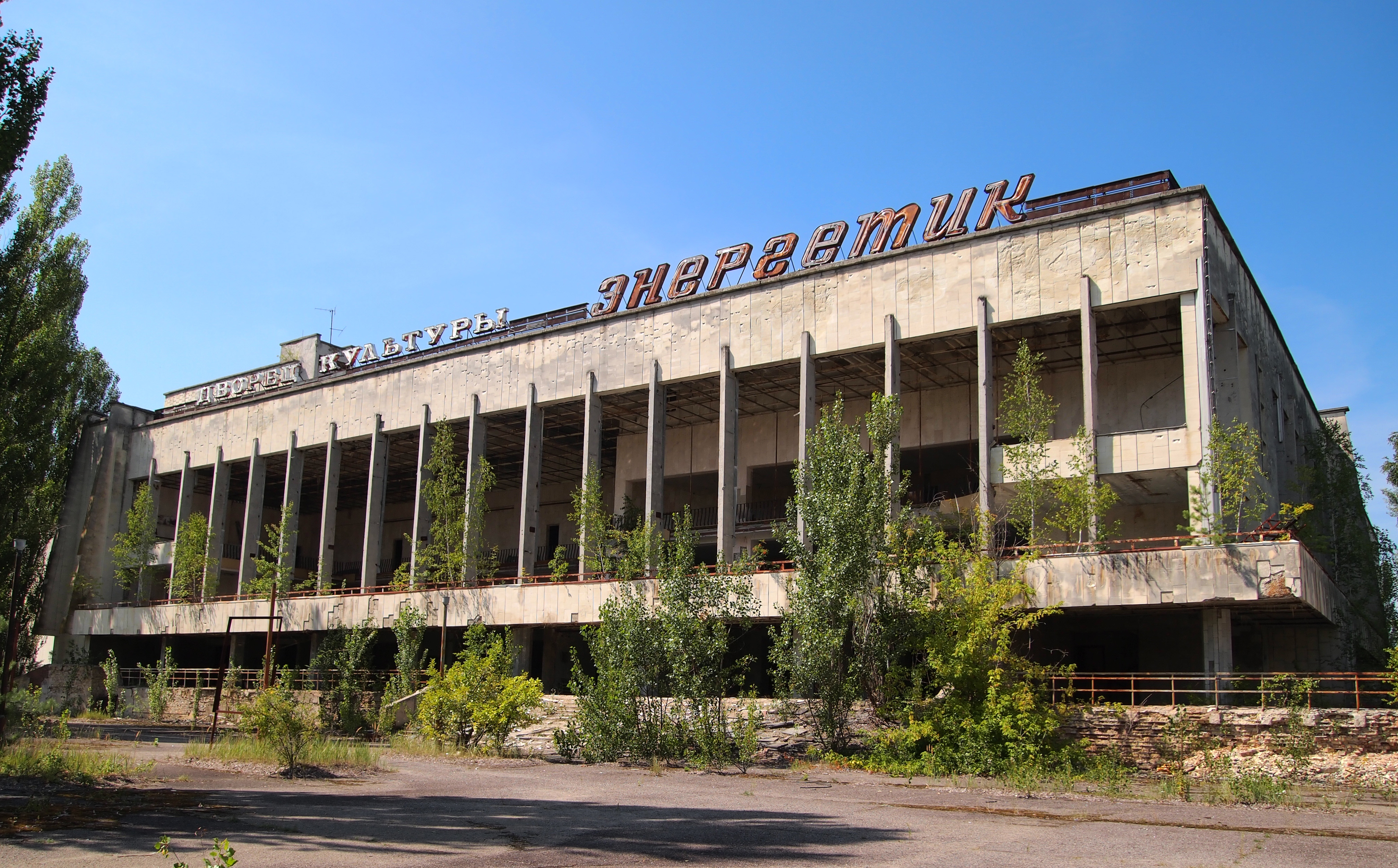
- Interactive map of Energetik
- Location: Lenin Square, Pripyat; Chernobyl Exclusion Zone, Ukraine
- Coordinates: 51°24′24.3″N 30°03′24.0″E
- Type: Cinema, Theatre, Concert hall, Swimming pool, Gymnasium, Boxing Ring, Study Hall, Shooting range, Do it yourself

Construction
- Built: 1970s
- Opened: 1970s
- Closed: 1986

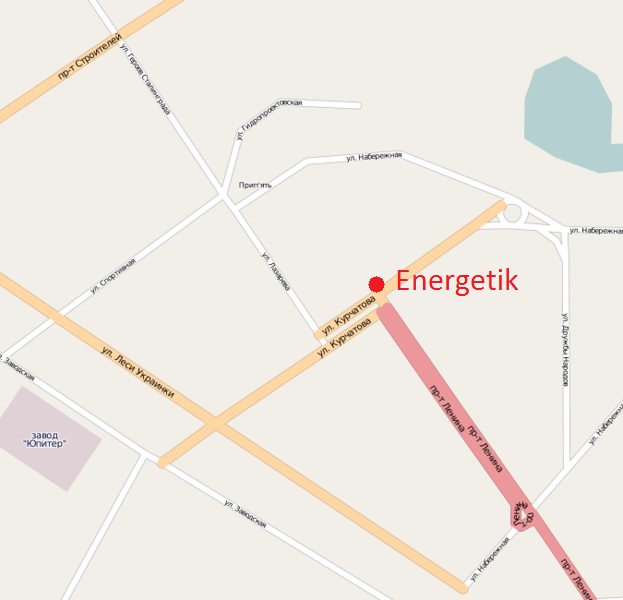
OSM locator map of the palace within the city of Pripyat

The Palace of Culture Energetik (Ukrainian: Палац культури «Енергетик», romanized: Palats kultury “Enerhetyk”; Russian: Дворец культуры Энергетик) is an abandoned palace of culture located in the town of Pripyat, at the Chernobyl Exclusion Zone in Ukraine.

== History ==
The Palace of Culture Energetik was built during the 1970s for the citizens of the town of Pripyat.

Palaces of Culture were large community centers established during the Soviet era with over 137,000 in the Soviet Union by 1988. These generally physically impressive buildings were designed as a focal point for people to enjoy a range of recreational and artistic activities all under the banner, quite literally in many cases, of political propaganda. Pripyat's Palace of Culture includes what's left of a cinema, theatre, library, gymnasium, swimming pool, boxing/wrestling ring, dancing and meeting halls and even has a shooting range in the basement.

After the Chernobyl disaster in 1986, the majority of the inhabitants of Pripyat were evacuated and the buildings were abandoned. The building was temporary utilized as a makeshift courtroom in July 1987, where six defendants who were accused as being responsible for the Chernobyl Nuclear Disaster stood trial. Currently, the Palace of Culture is in a dilapidated condition.

The Ukrainian writer Lyubov Sirota worked briefly in the Palace of Culture.

== Gallery ==
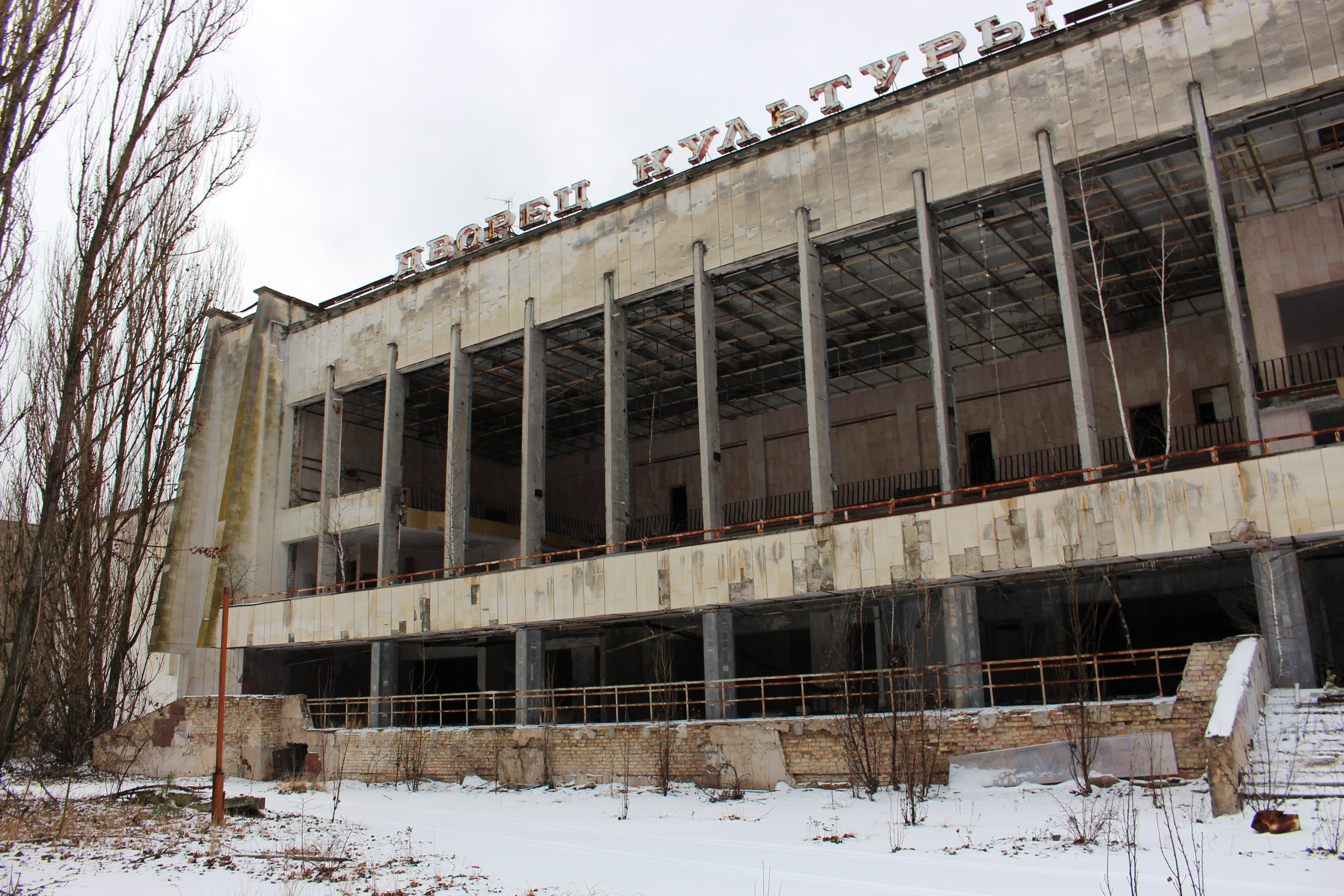

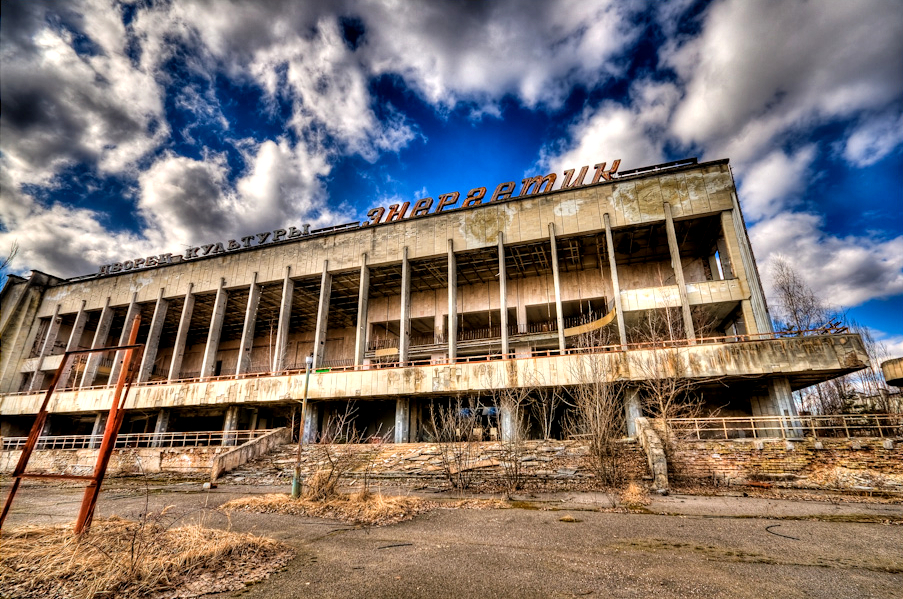

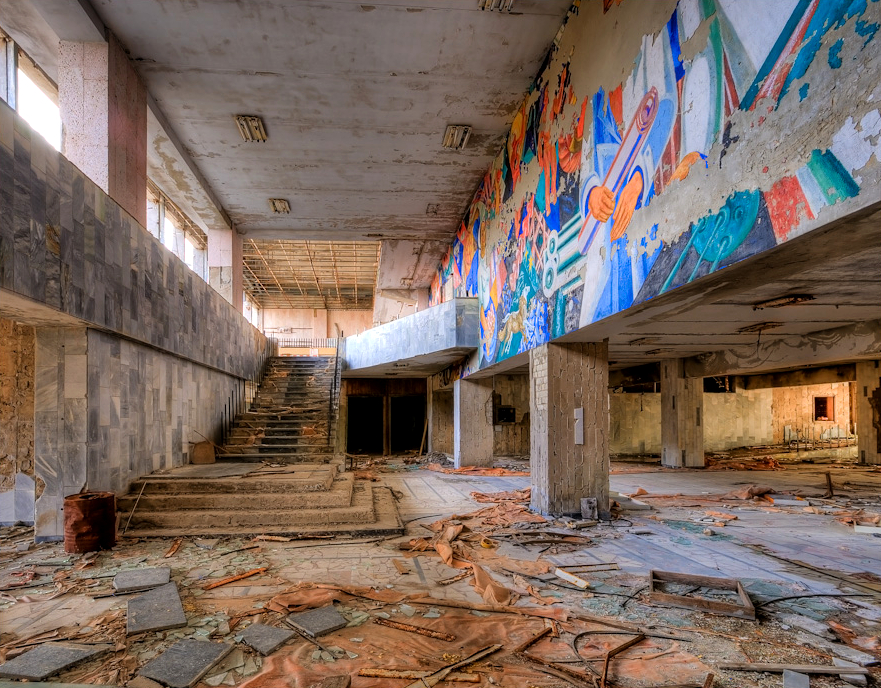

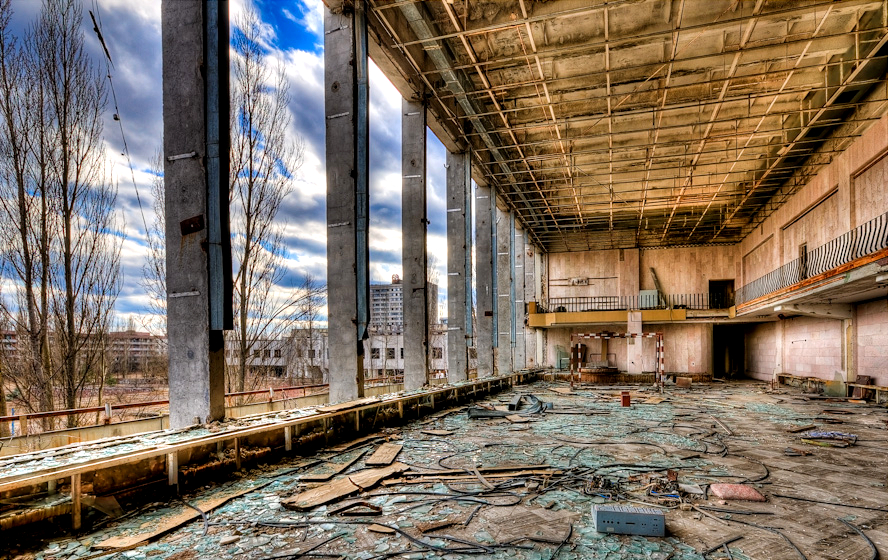

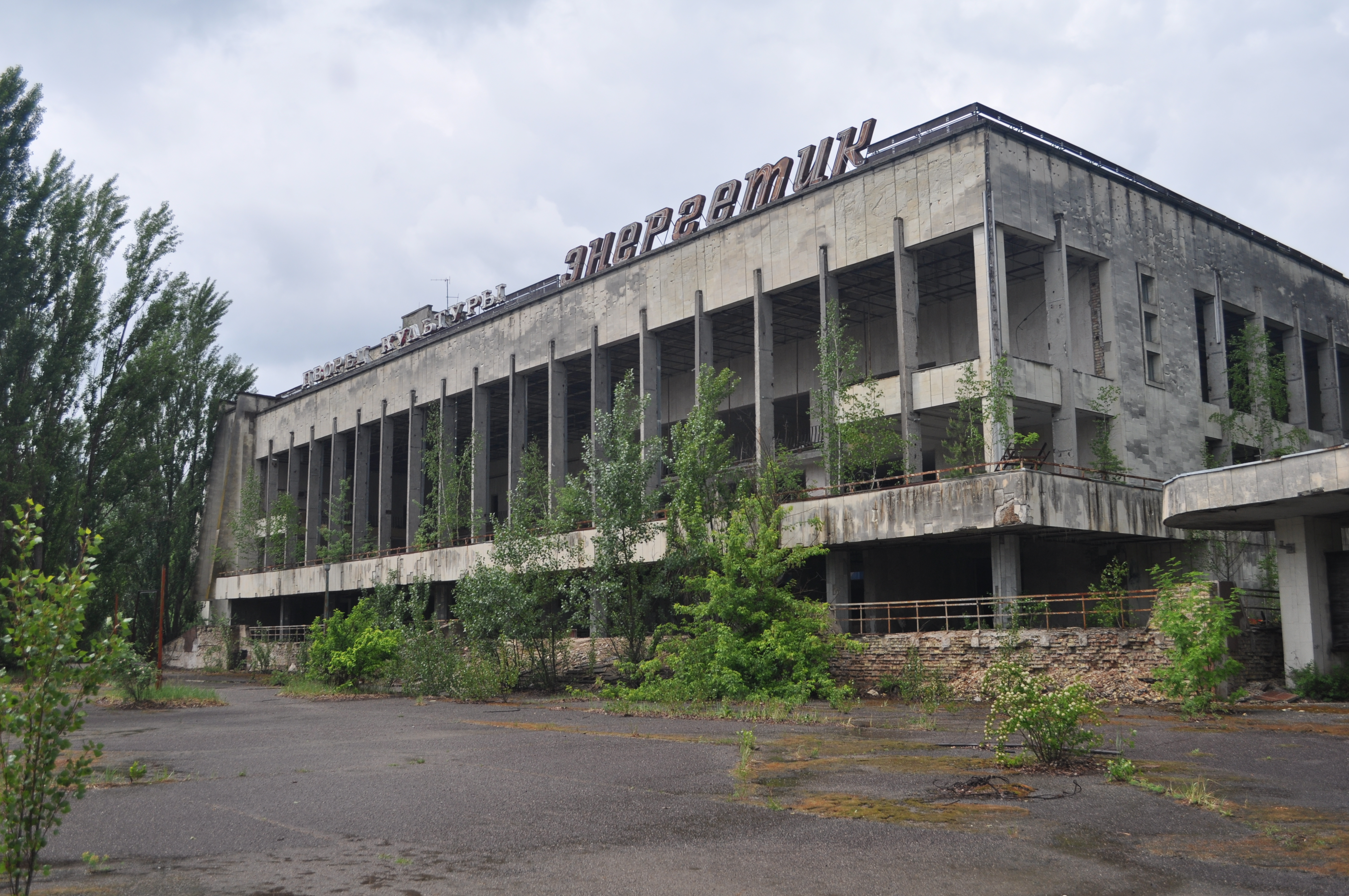

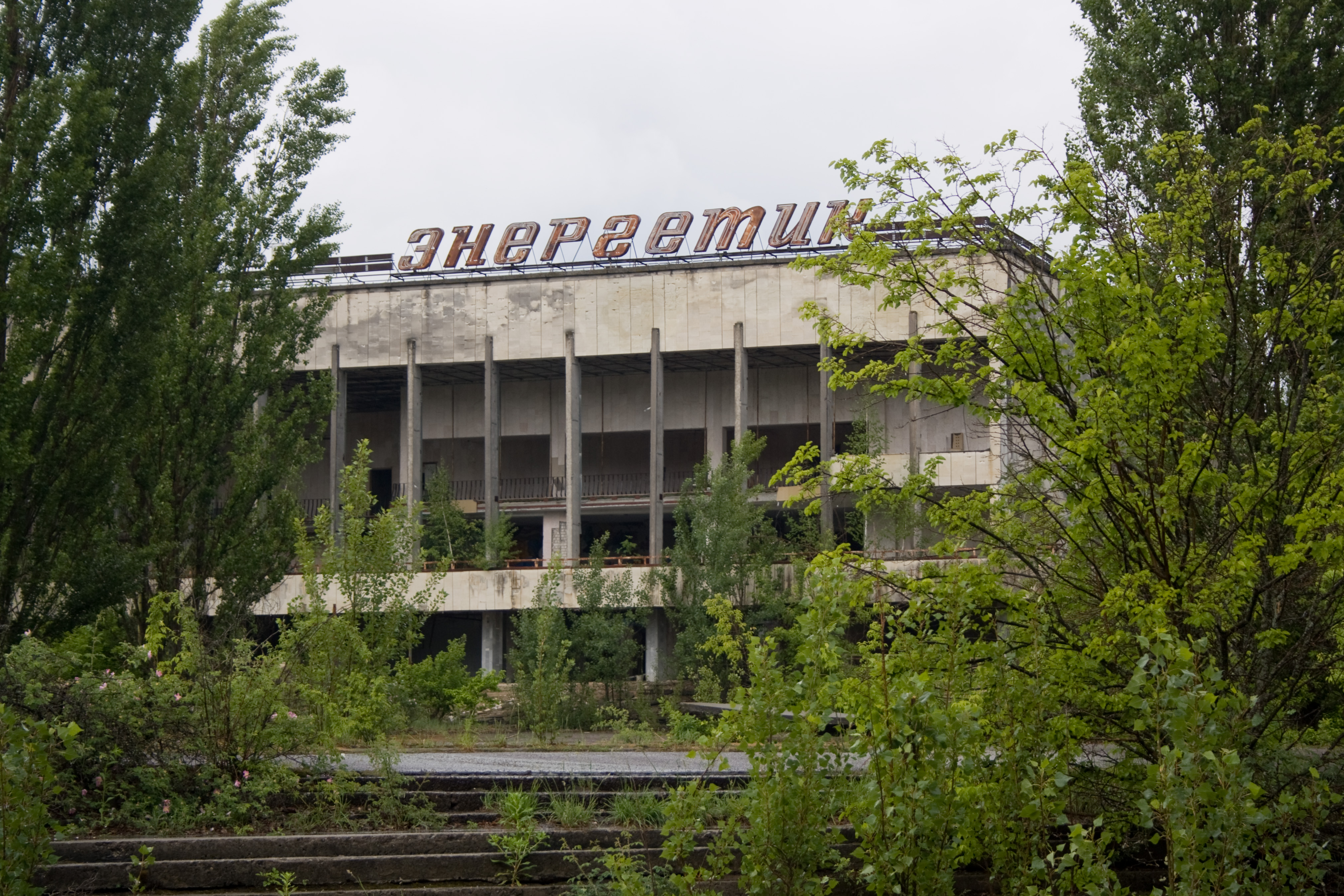

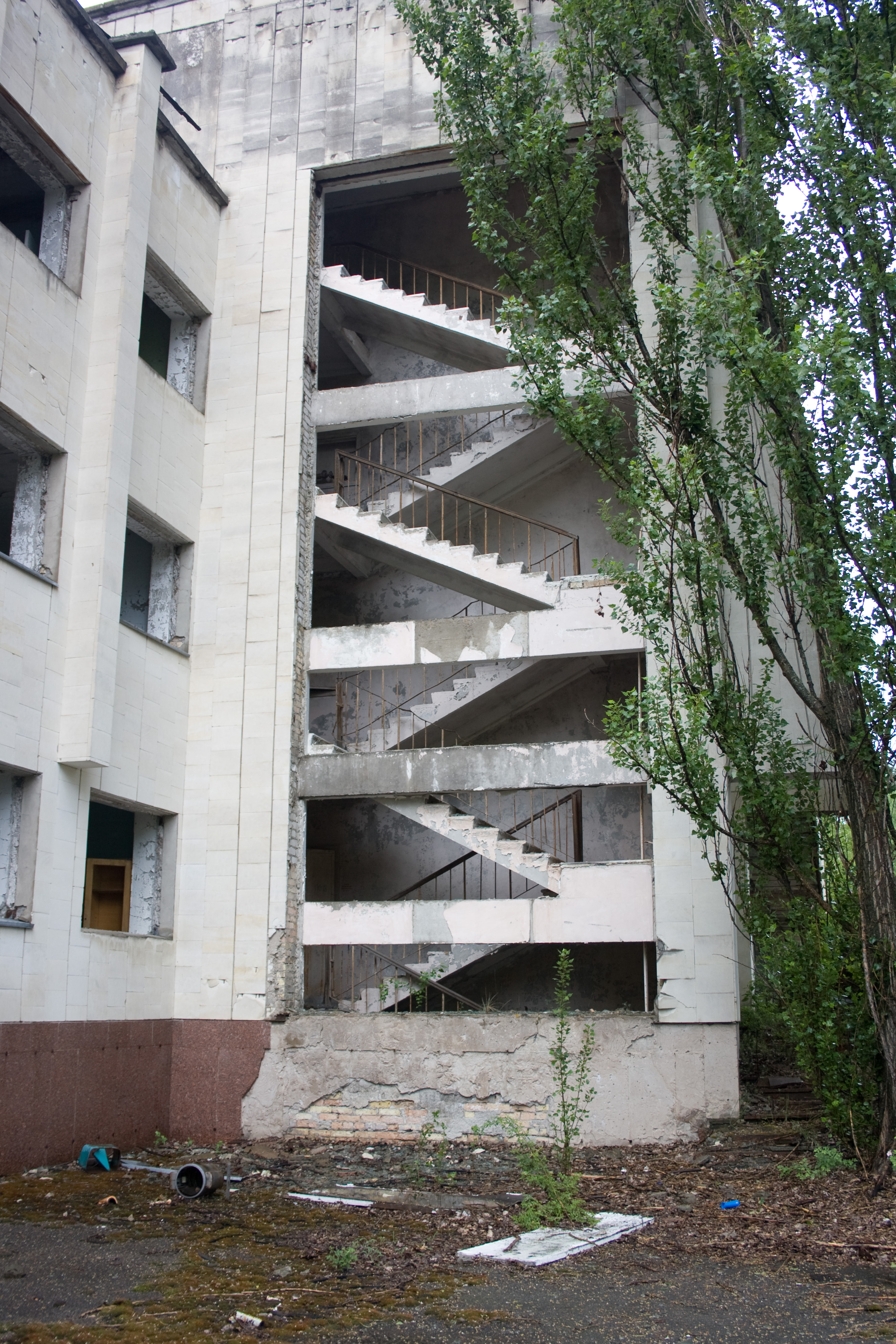

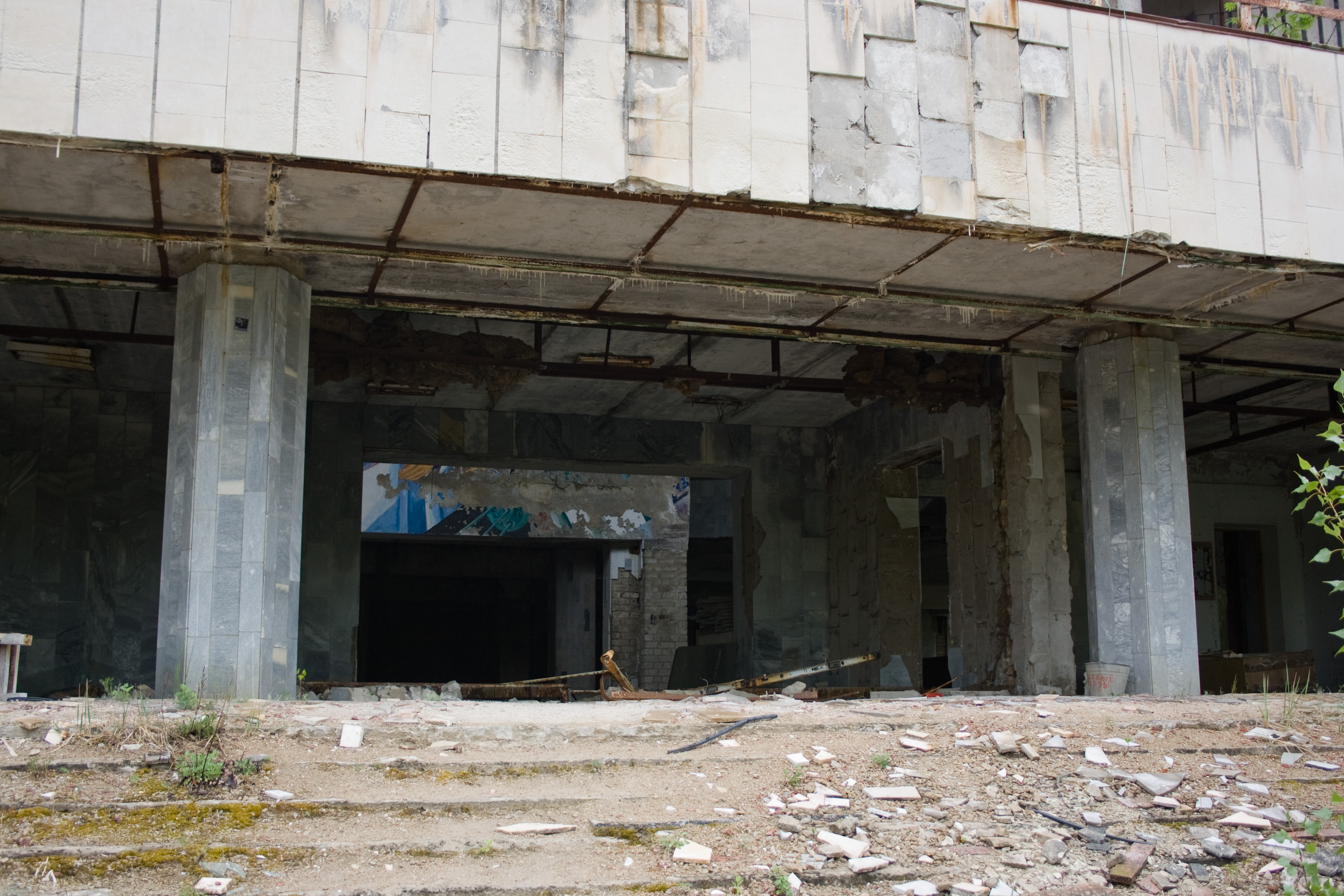
