= Ephysteris surda =

Scientific classification
- Kingdom: Animalia
- Phylum: Arthropoda
- Class: Insecta
- Order: Lepidoptera
- Family: Gelechiidae
- Genus: Ephysteris
- Species: E. surda

Binomial name
- Ephysteris surda (Meyrick, 1923)

Synonyms
- Aristotelia surda Meyrick, 1923

Species of moth

Ephysteris surda is a moth in the family Gelechiidae. It was described by Edward Meyrick in 1923. It is found in Myanmar.

The wingspan is about 12 mm. The forewings are dark fuscous and the stigmata are blackish, obscure, with the discal approximated and the plical very obliquely before the first discal. The hindwings are grey.
