= Ephysteris diminutella =

Scientific classification
- Kingdom: Animalia
- Phylum: Arthropoda
- Clade: Pancrustacea
- Class: Insecta
- Order: Lepidoptera
- Family: Gelechiidae
- Genus: Ephysteris
- Species: E. diminutella

Binomial name
- Ephysteris diminutella (Zeller, 1847)

Synonyms
- Gelechia diminutella Zeller, 1847; Phthorimaea lunaki Hartig, 1941; Ephysteris (Opacopsis) treskensis Povolný, 1964; Ephysteris (Opacopsis) foulonsensis Povolný, 1981; Eypysteris (Opacopsis) hispanica Povolný, 1981

Species of moth

Ephysteris diminutella is a moth in the family Gelechiidae. It was described by Zeller in 1847. It is found in Spain, France, Italy, Romania, North Macedonia, Greece and Russia, as well as on Sicily. Outside of Europe, it is found in North Africa and Palestine.
