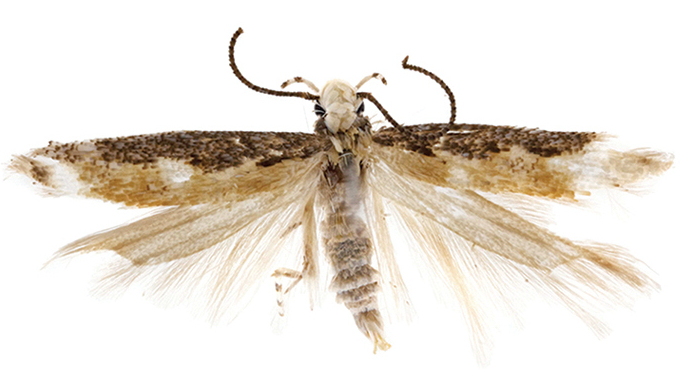
- A adult male sp.

Scientific classification
- Kingdom: Animalia
- Phylum: Arthropoda
- Clade: Pancrustacea
- Class: Insecta
- Order: Lepidoptera
- Family: Gelechiidae
- Genus: Neopalpa
- Species: N. donaldtrumpi

Binomial name
- Neopalpa donaldtrumpi Nazari, 2017
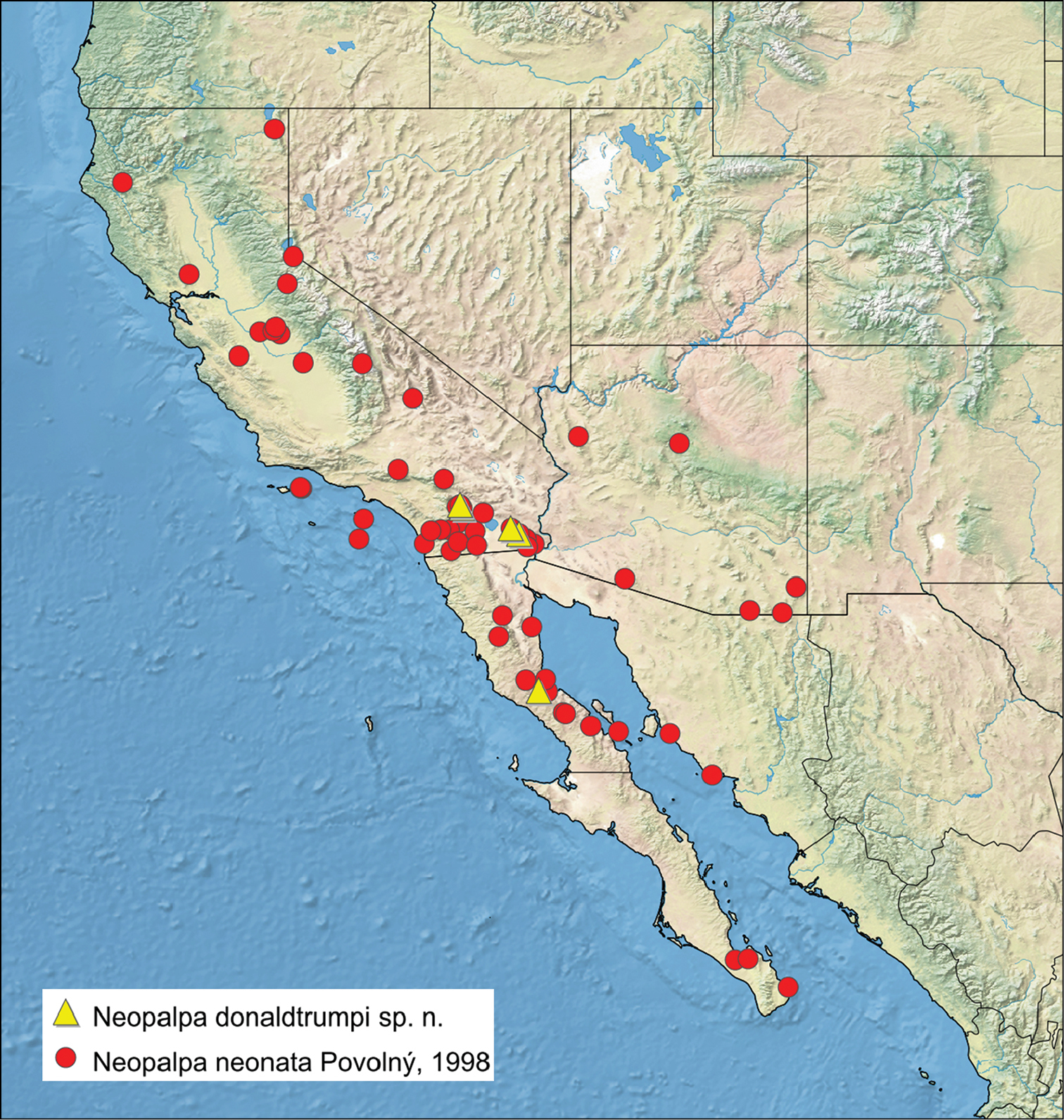
- Distribution of N. donaldtrumpi (yellow triangles)

= Neopalpa donaldtrumpi =

Species of moth

Neopalpa donaldtrumpi is a moth species of the genus Neopalpa occurring in Southern California and Northern Mexico. It was described in 2017 by Iranian-Canadian scientist Vazrick Nazari. Known for its yellowish-white head scales being reminiscent of US president Donald Trump's hair, the moth was given its name because Nazari stated that he wanted "to bring wider public attention to the need to continue protecting fragile habitats in the US that still contain many undescribed species."

== Discovery ==
The genus Neopalpa, including the species Neopalpa neonata, was first described in 1998 by Dalibor Povolný. Almost two decades later, Nazari reviewed the material, including specimens that had been collected since the first description of the genus, from the Bohart Entomology Museum. He considered that some of the specimens formed a new species. In January 2017 he published an article naming it Neopalpa donaldtrumpi for the yellowish-white color of the scales on the head, which reminded him of then President-elect Donald Trump's hairstyle.

== Description ==
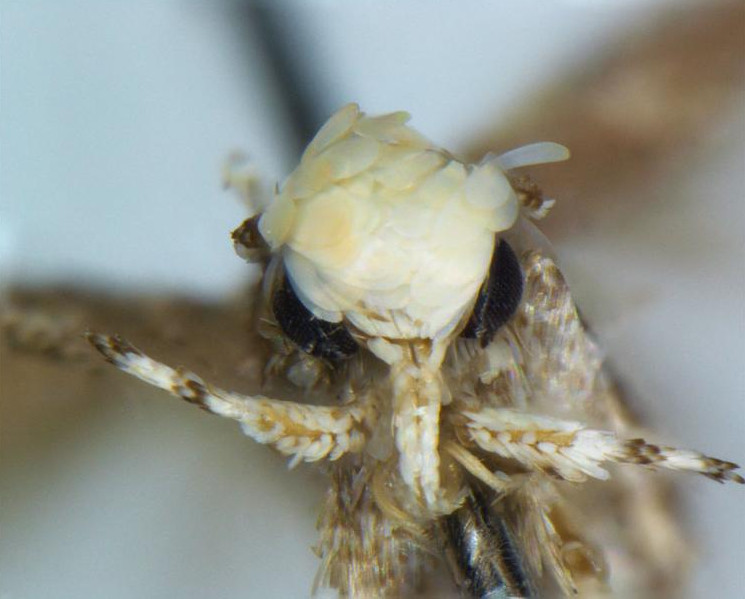
Head of N. donaldtrumpi

The upper surface of the N. donaldtrumpi forewings is orange-yellow except for dark brown patches on the fringe and anterior portions of the wing. The length between forewings is 3 mm (0.12 in) to 4.6 mm (0.18 in). Hindwings are pale buff, with dark fringes. The wings have similar coloration for both males and females. Its antennae are about two-thirds of its wingspan and its head is covered with yellowish white scales, which inspired the moth's name. Compared with N. neonata, the other species in the genus, N. donaldtrumpi male genitalia structures are smaller and female genitalia possess very few small setae.

== Distribution ==
While the closely related N. neonata occurs throughout much of California, Baja California and Northwest Mexico, specimens of N. donaldtrumpi have so far been found only in the Northern half of Baja California and Riverside and Imperial counties in Southern California.

== Biology ==
Neopalpa donaldtrumpi belongs to the twirler moths, known for their propensity to spin in circles on leaves. Adult specimens have been collected in February, April, June, and August, suggesting the species is active across multiple seasons throughout the year, though its exact lifespan and host plant are not known. Its habitat is threatened by urbanization.

== See also ==
- List of things named after Donald Trump
- List of organisms named after famous people (born 1925–1949)
