= Ephysteris infirma =

Scientific classification
- Domain: Eukaryota
- Kingdom: Animalia
- Phylum: Arthropoda
- Class: Insecta
- Order: Lepidoptera
- Family: Gelechiidae
- Genus: Ephysteris
- Species: E. infirma

Binomial name
- Ephysteris infirma (Meyrick, 1912)

Synonyms
- Gnorimoschema infirma Meyrick, 1912

Species of moth

Ephysteris infirma is a moth in the family Gelechiidae. It was described by Edward Meyrick in 1912. It is found in the Democratic Republic of the Congo (Orientale Province) and South Africa (KwaZulu-Natal).

The wingspan is 10–14 mm. The forewings are ochreous whitish or pale whitish ochreous, sprinkled with grey and dark fuscous specks. The stigmata are moderately large and blackish, the plical rather before the first discal, the second discal below the middle. The hindwings are very pale grey.
