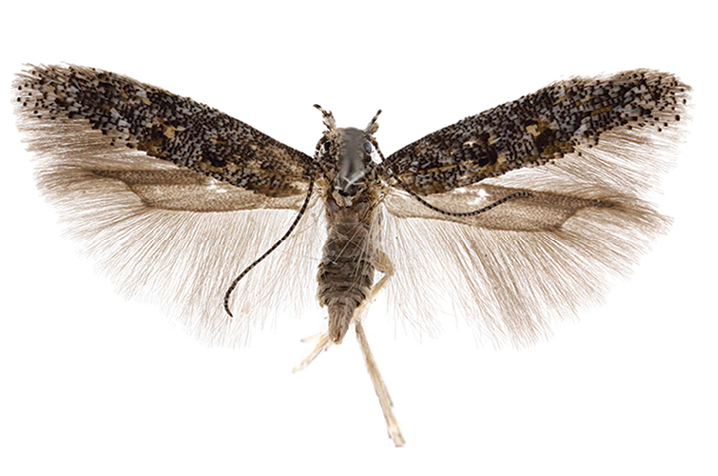
- Adult male

Scientific classification
- Domain: Eukaryota
- Kingdom: Animalia
- Phylum: Arthropoda
- Class: Insecta
- Order: Lepidoptera
- Family: Gelechiidae
- Genus: Neopalpa
- Species: N. neonata

Binomial name
- Neopalpa neonata Povolný, 1998
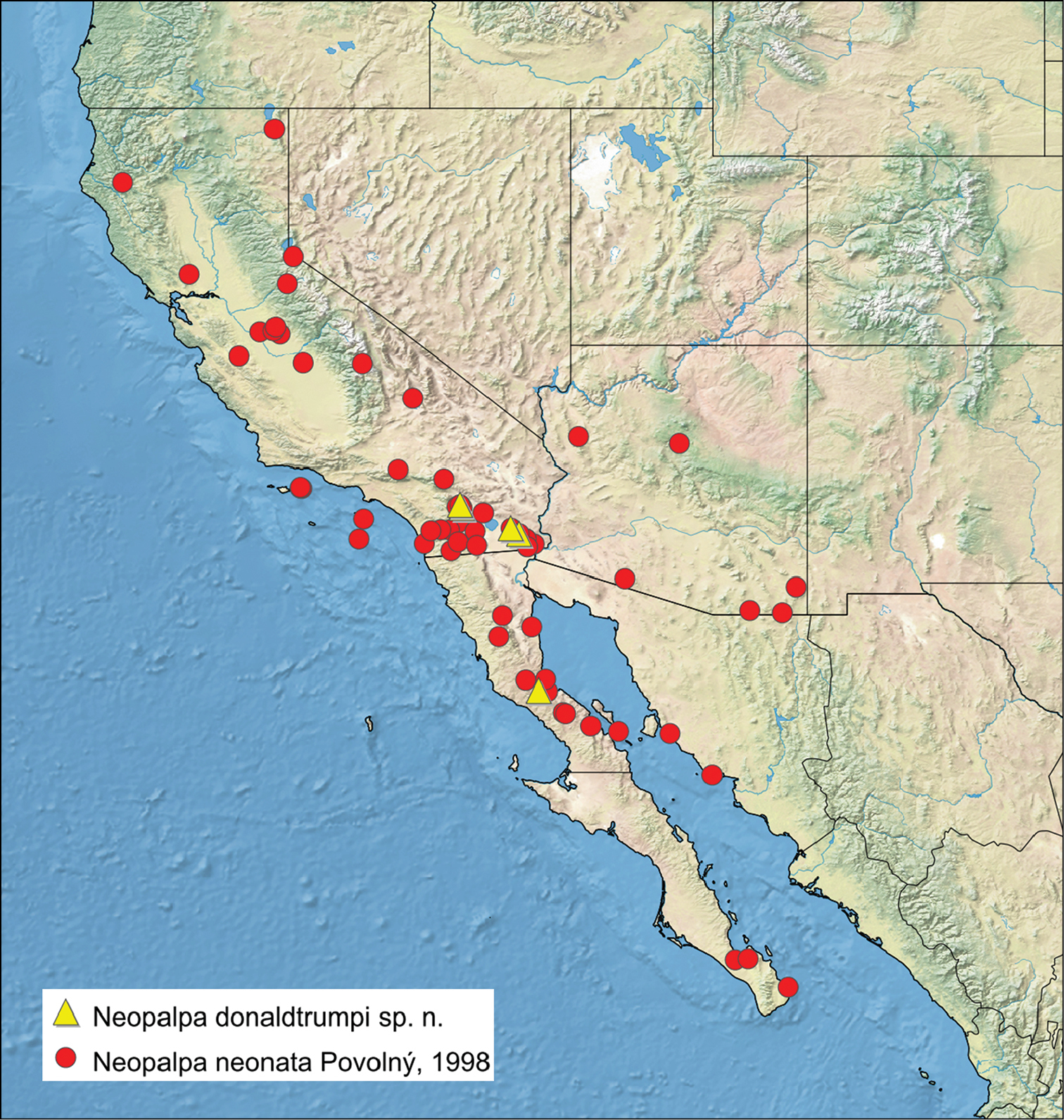
- Distribution of N. neonata (red dots)

= Neopalpa neonata =

Species of moth

Neopalpa neonata is a species of moth in the family Gelechiidae. It is found in southwest of North America, where it has been recorded throughout most of California, Arizona and the most western regions of Northern Mexico.

The other species in the genus Neopalpa is Neopalpa donaldtrumpi.
