= Ephysteris tenuisaccus =

Scientific classification
- Kingdom: Animalia
- Phylum: Arthropoda
- Clade: Pancrustacea
- Class: Insecta
- Order: Lepidoptera
- Family: Gelechiidae
- Genus: Ephysteris
- Species: E. tenuisaccus

Binomial name
- Ephysteris tenuisaccus Nupponen, 2010

Species of moth

Ephysteris tenuisaccus is a moth of the family Gelechiidae. It is found in Russia (the southern Ural) and on Cyprus. The habitat consists of chalk steppe.

The wingspan is 10.5–12.5 mm. Adults are on wing in June.
