= Ephysteris suasoria =

Scientific classification
- Kingdom: Animalia
- Phylum: Arthropoda
- Class: Insecta
- Order: Lepidoptera
- Family: Gelechiidae
- Genus: Ephysteris
- Species: E. suasoria

Binomial name
- Ephysteris suasoria (Meyrick, 1918)

Synonyms
- Phthorimaea suasoria Meyrick, 1918

Species of moth

Ephysteris suasoria is a moth in the family Gelechiidae. It was described by Edward Meyrick in 1918. It is found in southern India and Palestine.

The wingspan is about 10 mm. The forewings are ochreous whitish irrorated (sprinkled) with blackish and with short fine ochreous subcostal and median streaks from the base, as well as two blackish dots beneath the costa anteriorly and two in the disc rather obliquely beyond them respectively. The stigmata are blackish, placed on whitish spots partially suffused with ochreous, the plical beneath the first discal, the first discal very small, with a round whitish spot suffused with ochreous adjacent to the second beyond and beneath it. There are whitish spots on the tornus and costa opposite and there is an ochreous longitudinal median mark beyond these. There is also a suffused whitish apical spot. The hindwings are bluish grey.
