= Ephysteris synecta =

Scientific classification
- Kingdom: Animalia
- Phylum: Arthropoda
- Class: Insecta
- Order: Lepidoptera
- Family: Gelechiidae
- Genus: Ephysteris
- Species: E. synecta

Binomial name
- Ephysteris synecta (Meyrick, 1909)

Synonyms
- Gnorimoschema synecta Meyrick, 1909; Microcraspedus synecta

Species of moth

Ephysteris synecta is a moth in the family Gelechiidae. It was described by Edward Meyrick in 1909. It is found in Namibia, Zimbabwe and Gauteng, South Africa.

The wingspan is 10–11 mm. The forewings are fuscous irrorated (sprinkled) with dark fuscous in males and whitish ochreous irrorated with blackish in females. There are pale ochreous spots beneath the costa at one-sixth and one-third, between which are traces of an oblique bar of somewhat darker suffusion. The base of the dorsum is whitish ochreous and there are some ochreous markings about the fold towards the base. The stigmata are dark fuscous surrounded with rather deep ochreous, the plical rather obliquely before the first discal, the second discal somewhat below the middle. There are also whitish-ochreous spots on the tornus and costa opposite. The hindwings are pale grey.
