= Ephysteris sporobolella =

Scientific classification
- Kingdom: Animalia
- Phylum: Arthropoda
- Clade: Pancrustacea
- Class: Insecta
- Order: Lepidoptera
- Family: Gelechiidae
- Genus: Ephysteris
- Species: E. sporobolella

Binomial name
- Ephysteris sporobolella Landry, 2010

Species of moth

Ephysteris sporobolella is a moth in the family Gelechiidae. It was described by Bernard Landry in 2010. It is found on the Galápagos Islands.

The length of the forewings is 2.8-3.9 mm. Adults have been recorded on wing from January to June and in November.

== Etymology ==
The species name refers to the host plant, Sporobolus virginicus.
