= Ephysteris neosirota =

Scientific classification
- Domain: Eukaryota
- Kingdom: Animalia
- Phylum: Arthropoda
- Class: Insecta
- Order: Lepidoptera
- Family: Gelechiidae
- Genus: Ephysteris
- Species: E. neosirota

Binomial name
- Ephysteris neosirota (Janse, 1950)

Synonyms
- Aristotelia neosirota Janse, 1950

Species of moth

Ephysteris neosirota is a moth in the family Gelechiidae. It was described by Anthonie Johannes Theodorus Janse in 1950. It is found in Namibia.
