= Ephysteris deserticolella =

Scientific classification
- Kingdom: Animalia
- Phylum: Arthropoda
- Clade: Pancrustacea
- Class: Insecta
- Order: Lepidoptera
- Family: Gelechiidae
- Genus: Ephysteris
- Species: E. deserticolella

Binomial name
- Ephysteris deserticolella (Staudinger, 1871)

Synonyms
- Gelechia deserticolella Staudinger, 1871; Opacopsis buvati Povolný, 1992; Ephysteris buvati; Lita albocapitella Rebel, 1928

Species of moth

Ephysteris deserticolella is a moth of the family Gelechiidae. It is found on Cyprus and in Ukraine (the Crimea), south-eastern European Russia, Turkey, Iran and Afghanistan.
