= Ephysteris powelli =

Scientific classification
- Kingdom: Animalia
- Phylum: Arthropoda
- Clade: Pancrustacea
- Class: Insecta
- Order: Lepidoptera
- Family: Gelechiidae
- Genus: Ephysteris
- Species: E. powelli

Binomial name
- Ephysteris powelli (Povolný, 1999)

Synonyms
- Microcraspedus powelli Povolný, 1999

Species of moth

Ephysteris powelli is a moth in the family Gelechiidae. It was described by Povolný in 1999. It is found in North America, where it has been recorded from California.
