= Ephysteris inustella =

Scientific classification
- Kingdom: Animalia
- Phylum: Arthropoda
- Clade: Pancrustacea
- Class: Insecta
- Order: Lepidoptera
- Family: Gelechiidae
- Genus: Ephysteris
- Species: E. inustella

Binomial name
- Ephysteris inustella (Zeller, 1839)

Synonyms
- Gelechia inustella Zeller, 1839; Epithectis delminiella Rebel, 1904; Lita gredosensis Rebel, 1935

Species of moth

Ephysteris inustella is a moth in the family Gelechiidae. It was described by Philipp Christoph Zeller in 1839. It is found in Portugal, Spain, France, Germany, Italy, Austria, the Czech Republic, Slovakia, Poland, Hungary, Bosnia and Herzegovina, the Baltic region, Ukraine and Russia.

== Subspecies ==
- Ephysteris inustella inustella
- Ephysteris inustella gredosensis (Rebel, 1935) (Spain, Portugal)
