= Ephysteris accentella =

Scientific classification
- Kingdom: Animalia
- Phylum: Arthropoda
- Clade: Pancrustacea
- Class: Insecta
- Order: Lepidoptera
- Family: Gelechiidae
- Genus: Ephysteris
- Species: E. accentella

Binomial name
- Ephysteris accentella Povolný, 1968

Species of moth

Ephysteris accentella is a moth in the family Gelechiidae. It was described by Povolný in 1968. It is found in Afghanistan.
