= Ephysteris leptocentra =

Scientific classification
- Kingdom: Animalia
- Phylum: Arthropoda
- Class: Insecta
- Order: Lepidoptera
- Family: Gelechiidae
- Genus: Ephysteris
- Species: E. leptocentra

Binomial name
- Ephysteris leptocentra (Meyrick, 1912)

Synonyms
- Aristotelia leptocentra Meyrick, 1912; Phthorimaea atalopis Meyrick, 1918

Species of moth

Ephysteris leptocentra is a moth in the family Gelechiidae. It was described by Edward Meyrick in 1912. It is found in Sri Lanka, southern India, Bengal and Myanmar.

The wingspan is 9–10 mm. The forewings are whitish ochreous, irregularly marbled with pale grey suffusion, the marblings sometimes sprinkled with blackish points. The first discal stigma is very faint and ferruginous, the plical and second discal distinct, blackish, with the plical slightly before the first discal, all these surrounded by clear spaces of ground colour. The hindwings are ochreous whitish or grey whitish.
