= Ephysteris sirota =

Scientific classification
- Kingdom: Animalia
- Phylum: Arthropoda
- Class: Insecta
- Order: Lepidoptera
- Family: Gelechiidae
- Genus: Ephysteris
- Species: E. sirota

Binomial name
- Ephysteris sirota (Meyrick, 1908)

Synonyms
- Aristolia sirota Meyrick, 1908; Aristotelia fluidescens Meyrick, 1914

Species of moth

Ephysteris sirota is a moth in the family Gelechiidae. It was described by Edward Meyrick in 1908. It is found in the South Africa provinces of Gauteng, KwaZulu-Natal and Limpopo.

The wingspan is about 15 mm. The forewings are ochreous whitish, faintly streaked longitudinally with pale brownish ochreous and with some dark fuscous irroration (sprinkles) tending to form indistinct streaks on the veins. The plical stigma is small and fuscous and the second discal is formed by a small round spot of dark fuscous irroration. The hindwings are grey whitish.
