= Alexander Sirota =

Ukrainian photographer, journalist, and filmmaker

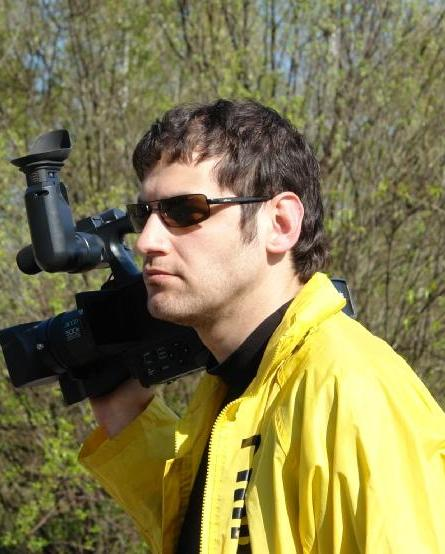
- Born: June 7, 1976 (age 50); Kiselivka, Ukrainian SSR, Soviet Union
- Occupations: Journalist; photographer; filmmaker

Alexander Yukhymovych Sirota (Ukrainian: Олександр Юхимович Сирота, Russian: Александр Ефимович Сирота; born June 7, 1976) is a Ukrainian photographer, journalist, and filmmaker. He writes in Russian and Ukrainian. As a former resident of Pripyat, he is an eyewitness and a victim of the 1986 Chernobyl disaster. He has devoted many articles, photographs, and video reports to the city of Pripyat and to the Chernobyl catastrophe. He is the editor-in-chief of the internet project "pripyat.com" and the president of the International Public Organization "Center Pripyat.com". In May 2008, he became the winner of the ІХ-th international competition "Golden George" of films, TV-programs, and internet projects about protective law and law enforcement. In that competition, Alexander won "The Big Tape of George" award for his website devoted to Chernobyl. He has been a member of the Union of Journalists of Ukraine since 2008 and a member of International Federation of Journalists.

== Biography ==
Alexander Sirota was born on June 7, 1976, in Kiselevka of the Kherson area, Ukraine. From 1983, Alexander and his mother, Lyubov Sirota, lived in the new city of Pripyat, the satellite of the Chernobyl Nuclear Power Plant — only 1.5 kilometers away from the plant. There, Alexander studied in school No. 1 until April 26, 1986, when the Chernobyl disaster occurred.

In April 1986 I was not yet 10 years old. For me, then a care-free little boy, and for my age group the cozy little streets of our town, all its yards and back alleys, and also the nearby wood and the Pripyat River, were the scenes of our childish play and "war games". That fatal Saturday, 26 April, was no exception. I remember how my friends and I, after school, ran down to the stream and played on its banks almost until nightfall, building fortresses and dugouts. ... ...the evacuation itself then also seemed like an exciting game, only now with real camouflaged military helicopters flying low over the roofs, with real armoured troop-carriers, with militiamen in flak jackets and gas masks standing along the road, with an endless line of buses taking us and all the town's population "for three days" to an unknown destination. We did not know and did not understand then that we were leaving our town for ever...

— Alexander Sirota "I want them to remember"

On April 27, all inhabitants of Pripyat were evacuated due to a disaster at the Chernobyl Nuclear Power Plant. Everyone was forced to leave the city with the promise that they would be able to return soon.

From 1987, Alexander lived in Kyiv, where he finished high school No. 267 in 1994. Later on, he finished the International Solomon University of Kyiv with a degree in history.

Alexander's first experience as a journalist came from his work about the Chernobyl tragedy titled "I Want Them to Remember," which has been translated into English and published in the magazine of the Department of Humanitarian Affairs of the United Nations. After this publication, in April 1996, Alexander has been invited by the Greenpeace to the United States to participate in the international action GREENPEACE "Testimonies tours", where Alexander (nicknamed "Sasha") was a representative of Ukraine in mass actions and meetings with the public and the Ukrainian diaspora, which were devoted to the tenth anniversary of the Chernobyl Catastrophe.

Photos of Alexander Sirota: View of the center of ghost town Pripyat including Chernobyl power plant, 2007

Nowadays, Alexander's articles and photo-reports are published in various mass media outlets (including newspapers such as "Literary Ukraine", "PostChernobyl", and "Your Health"), and his video reports were used by many Ukrainian and Russian channels and also by the BBC. In December 2006, his video report about the marauding in the Chernobyl Exclusion Zone and Pripyat was broadcast by the 5th channel of Ukraine. As a result of his report, the Government filed criminal charges for plunder and export of materials from the radiation-polluted zone and created a governmental commission for investigation.

From January to March 2005, Alexander worked as an editor of a section "Literature and the Art" of the internet project "Pripyat.com." Later, he became the editor-in-chief of this project. In 2006, Alexander was elected to be the vice-president of the International Public Organization "Center PRIPYAT.com," the primary goal of which is to report the truthful information about the city of Pripyat, the Chernobyl Catastrophe, and the consequences of the catastrophe to the people all around the world. The center, for the purpose of shedding a truthful light on the Chernobyl Catastrophe, organizes and carries out fact-finding excursions into the Chernobyl Zone and Pripyat. As Alexander has told the correspondent of the Russian Information Agency (RIA News) Ivan Sheglov: "I want to believe that those, who visited Pripyat, would not be able to live in a way that there would be dead cities left after them..."

When Alexander was the editor-in-chief of "pripyat.com," he wrote and posted together with "Literary Ukraine" a petition titled "An Appeal to the President, the Government and the Supreme Rada of Ukraine, to the Chapters of all countries of the world, the Council of Europe, UNESCO, the United Nations," to make Pripyat a city-monument and to grant it International status of the City-Museum. Additionally, they asked to include under protection the 15-km zone of alienation around Pripyat and the city Chernobyl. Furthermore, their appeal asked to grant the Exclusion Zone a status of a historical-ecological reservation and to turn it into a monument, the place of the greatest technological accident on the planet.

Additionally, among the projects that Pripyat.com undertakes, is the project titled "The Photo of Your Home." This project is made for former Pripyat residents.

== Articles, interviews, and photo- and video-reports ==
- "I want them to remember" — DHA NEWS No.16, September/October 1995
- Pripyat 2006. Winter
- Pripyat. Winter 2006. Photo report, part 2
- "Zone. Prypyat. Winter-2006" — 2006" — video.
- Specially for PRIPYAT.COM. Interview with Rollan Sergienko, the director of the most well-known films about Chernobyl — the newspaper “PostChornobyl” (29), March 2006 (in Ukrainian).
- "Spring walk in Pripyat" — 2006 — video.
- Video-reporting about the visiting of Chernobyl Zone by the writers of the festival “EUROCON — 2006”
- Report about visiting Chernobyl atomic power station in November, 30, 2006 — photos and video
- Flight above Chernobyl, 2007 — video.
- Pripyat from height of the bird's flight. Photo-reporting, 2007
- Video-interview of the former Deputy Chairman of the Pripyat City Executive Committee, Alexander Esaulov
- The seminar for mass-media on Chernobyl atomic power station. Photo-reporting, 2007
- Pripyat, May, 9, 2007.The picture story
- "Presentation of the site Pripyat.com", 2007 — video.
- "WE'LL UNDERSTAND LATER", 2009 — the film about still alive Pripyat.
- Channel 5: Pripyat the City-Museum — video reporting of Alexander Sirota about initiative of the granting to city of Pripyat of the International status of the City-museum
- Old-New Year in Pripyat, 13–14.01.2010 - photos of Alexander Sirota
