= Ephysteris pentamacula =

Scientific classification
- Domain: Eukaryota
- Kingdom: Animalia
- Phylum: Arthropoda
- Class: Insecta
- Order: Lepidoptera
- Family: Gelechiidae
- Genus: Ephysteris
- Species: E. pentamacula

Binomial name
- Ephysteris pentamacula Janse, 1958

Synonyms
- Ochrodia pentamacula

Species of moth

Ephysteris pentamacula is a moth in the family Gelechiidae. It was described by Anthonie Johannes Theodorus Janse in 1958. It is found in Namibia and South Africa.
