= Lyubov Sirota =

Ukrainian poet and writer

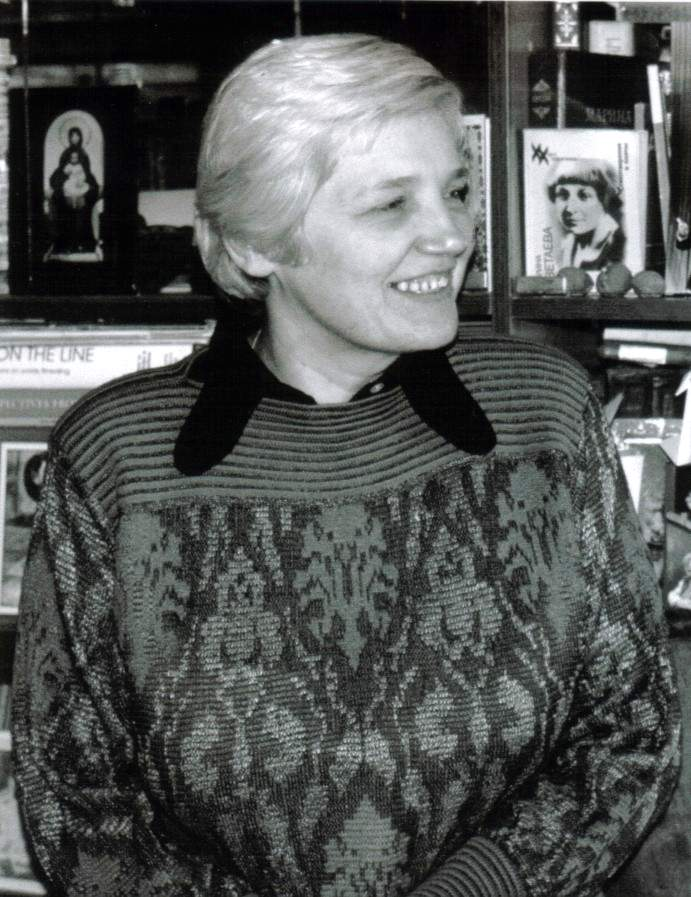
- Born: 21 June 1956 (age 70); Irtyshsk, Kazakh SSR, Soviet Union
- Occupations: Poet; writer; playwright; journalist; translator
- Children: Alexander Sirota

Lyubov Makarivna Sirota (Ukrainian: Любов Макарівна Сирота; born 21 June 1956) is a Ukrainian poet, writer, playwright, journalist and translator. As a former inhabitant of the city of Pripyat and an eyewitness (and victim) of the Chernobyl disaster, she has devoted a great part of her creative output to the 1986 catastrophe. She writes in both Ukrainian and Russian, and also translates from Ukrainian into Russian and vice versa. Her poems have been translated into many languages, including English.

== Life ==
Sirota was born in Irtyshsk, Pavlodar Province, Kazakhstan (then a part of the USSR) to a large family which had been deported from Ukraine. When she was one, her family moved to the Kyrgyzstan capital, Frunze (now Bishkek). Her mother wanted to move to the city so that her children could have more opportunities for education and development. Sirota spent her childhood in Frunze, where she was a member of the city literary studio ("The Dawn of Mountains"). There she developed a dissident spirit: fostering freedom and love of truth. Her first literary works were printed in Kyrgyzstan magazines.

In 1975, Sirota moved with her parents to their ancestral homeland, Ukraine. There, she received a degree in Russian language and literature from the philology department at Dnipropetrovsk National University. In 1983 she moved with her son Alexander to the new city of Pripyat (near the Chernobyl Atomic Energy Station, 1.5 km away), where she headed the literary group "Prometheus" and a literary studio for children. She also managed department of the Palace of Culture Energetik (literally, the "energy plant worker"). At the Palace of Culture, Sirota wrote and directed two plays: the musical "We Couldn't Not Find Each Other" and "My Specialty — a life", a biography of the Russian poet Marina Tsvetaeva. The latter play was more successful, and was scheduled to be repeated. When the Chernobyl nuclear station exploded on 26 April 1986, Sirota and her son were among the tens of thousands evacuated from the area following the event. Their lives were forever changed due to the evacuation, the loss of friends and acquaintances, and the assault on their health due to radiation exposure.

After her evacuation from Pripyat she reorganized "Prometheus", using poetry and music to proclaim the truth about the Chernobyl area and its people. However, repeated hospitalization for fatigue and pain (typical results of radiation exposure) increasingly interfered with her work. To express her grief and rage, she wrote poetry and collected them in a book, "Burden". Burden was published in 1990 in Kyiv. Since 1992 Sirota has been an invalid; however, at home she continues her efforts to prevent another Chernobyl. Sirota, with her family, moved to Kyiv in 2011. In Kyiv, Sirota worked as a film editor at Dovzhenko Film Studios.

Her poems have been translated from Russian into other languages, and are known in many countries from the translation of Burden into English by Elisavietta Ritchie, Leonid Levin and Birgitta Ingemanson, with the assistance of Professor Paul Brians. Sirota's poetry has been published in magazines and anthologies in the United States, Canada and the UK.

In 2022, after a full-scale Russian invasion of Ukraine and a month-and-a-half stay under occupation, Lyubov Sirota was forced to leave her homeland and now lives abroad. In August 2022, she participated in the 75th anniversary of the Edinburgh International Festival in "the Poetry Reading: Art and Activism in the Nuclear Age" at the Scottish Poetry Library.

On 7 January 2023 Lyubov Sirota's poetry was presented at the Modern Language Association of America (MLA) convention in San Francisco, where her poetry was presented by past president of the Joseph Conrad Society of America, Ph.D. Debra Romanick Baldwin from the University of Dallas.

== Work ==
=== Poetry ===
Sirota's poetry became more widely known after Rollan Serhienko's 1988 film about the Chernobyl catastrophe, Threshold on YouTube (which she co-authored) and her 1990 anthology Burden, published in Kyiv.

Center of ghost town Pripyat (including Chernobyl power plant), 2007. Photo by Alexander Sirota

Burden opens with a triptych of poems devoted to the evacuated city of Pripyat. The dead city only comes to life at night, in the dreams of people who have fled from it:

"At night, of course, our town though emptied forever, comes to life. There, our dreams wander like clouds, illuminate windows with moonlight." (Translated from the Russian by Leonid Levin and Elisavietta Ritchie)

In the second verse, we see stars falling on a city roadway:

"…And stars are thrust down onto the pavement, to stand guard until morning." (Translated from the Russian by Leonid Levin and Elisavietta Ritchie)

The city dies at each dawn:

"…We are doomed to be left behind by the flock in the harshest of winters… But when you fly off don't forget us, grounded in the field! And no matter to what joyful faraway lands your happy wings bear you, may our charred wings protect you from carelessness." (Translated from the Russian by Leonid Levin and Elisavietta Ritchie)

Sirota's poetry is, at times, full of indignation:

"…But nothing will silence us! Even after death, from our graves we will appeal to your Conscience not to transform the Earth into a sarcophagus! … (Translated from the Russian by Leonid Levin and Elisavietta Ritchie)

The third poem of the triptych is devoted to reflection on moral responsibility and civil duties:

"...Life went up in smoke from somebody's campfire (this world has inquisitors to spare!). Everything burned, burned up. Even the ashes were not always left behind...

...But with merciful hands you extinguish the fatal fire under me. May the flame of the redeemed soul shield you!" (Translated from the Russian by Leonid Levin and Elisavietta Ritchie)

Sirota is especially angry in her poem, Radiophobia (radiophobia is the fear of ionizing radiation), which is directed against the lies and double standards of the criminal authorities of the former USSR).

Radiophobia, featured in Threshold and on radio, inspired Julio Soto to be the writer-director of the Spanish-American film Radiophobia and artist Michael Genovese to paint window frescoes containing the poem in the Ukrainian Village, Chicago, in 2006.

Before the Chernobyl catastrophe, Lyubov Sirota wrote more the lyrical poems, which were published in Kyrgyzstan periodicals and in newspapers of Ukraine: "Dnepr Miner", "Tribune of Power Specialist", "Flag of the Victory", etc.; in the literary almanac "Literary Ukraine"; in the collective poetic collections of Ukraine — "The Steps" and of Russia – "The Sources", etc.

After Chernobyl, her products were published in newspapers and almanacs of Ukraine: “The Truth Ukraine”, “Literary Ukraine”, "National newspaper", "Independent Ukraine", "Our Ukraine", "Your Health ", "Ukrainian Forum ", "Education", "Chernobyl Newspaper", "Post Chernobyl " and in many other; in the magazines “Ukraine”, “Dnipro”, "Extreme Situation", "Scientific World", etc., in Latvian magazine " Cinema " No.4/1989; and in the poetic collections: "Chernobyl. Days of tests" (Kyiv, 1988), "Passing in a zone" — the poetic anthology (Kyiv, 1996), "Chernobyl beside..." (Kyiv, 2000), etc.

Now her poems are known all over the world, thanks to the translations into English, German, Japanese, Italian, Polish (in Polish her lyrical poems have been published in the collective collection "Ukrainian Love Poetry", Warszawa, 1991). Paul Brians and his web page about Lyubov Sirota "The Chernobyl Poems of Lyubov Sirota" has helped spread word of her works. Her poems have been read on NPR of America (program Terra Infirma), have been issued in English in anthologies, almanacs, magazines and poetic collections of US and Canada: "Life on the Line: Selections on Words and Healing"; "Perspectives from the Past"; "A Fierce Brightness: Twenty-Five Years of Women's Poetry", and also in the Canadian and American magazines: "Calyx", "Woman World", "Promin'", "Journal of the American Medical Association"; "New York Quarterly", "WISE", "The Russell Record Magazine", "The Modern Review", "In Our Own Words", etc.

Her own translations of the poetry of known Ukrainian poet Vasyl Stus in Russian have been issued in the book "Vasyl Stus", "And you same burn down" (Kyiv, 2005).

=== Plays ===
- "We Couldn't Not Find Each Other" – a one-act musical.
- "My Specialty — a life" – two-act biography of the Russian poet Marina Tsvetaeva.
- Lyubov Sirota in time of work the play "My Specialty – a Life", Pripyat, 1985 on YouTube. (video)

=== Article and essays ===
- “The modelling of the future – is a reality” – ПОСТ ЧЕРНОБЫЛЬ/POST CHERNOBYL", 2004. (in Russian see here: https://web.archive.org/web/20100528011516/http://www.wsu.edu/~brians/chernobyl_poems/savedplanet.html)
- "Excessive burden" (in Russian:"ПОСТ ЧЕРНОБЫЛЬ/POST CHERNOBYL", №№3–22, of 01.04.2008)

=== Books and publications ===
- Burden: Lyrics. Kyiv, 1990. 77 pages. The book cover and pictures of the known Ukrainian artist Andrey Chebykin – ISBN 5-333-00637-7 (for translation, see https://web.archive.org/web/20091009104207/http://www.wsu.edu/~brians/chernobyl_poems/chernobyl_poems.html)
- Pripyat syndrome: the film-story – Poltava, 2009, 196 pages – ISBN 978-966-18-2031-8 (in Russian see here: http://www.proza.ru/2009/04/30/197)
- THE PRIPYAT SYNDROME: A FILM STORY Kindle Edition by Lyubov Sirota; Language: English, ASIN: B08WX8D7BY Publication date: 17 February 2021, File Size: 447 KB, Print Length: 311 pages
- THE PRIPYAT SYNDROME: A FILM STORY Paperback – 18 February 2021, The Pripyat Syndrome by Lyubov Sirota; Language: English, Publisher: Independently published (18 February 2021), Paperback: 202 pages, ISBN 979-8710522875 – Lyubov Sirota (Author), Birgitta Ingemanson (Editor), Paul Brians (Editor), A. Yukhimenko (Illustrator), Natalia Ryumina (Translator)
- Vasyl’ Stus. "And you same burn down". Poetry. Kyiv, 1990. 77 pages. – ISBN 5-333-00637-7 (in Russian and Ukrainian) – translator Lyubov Sirota
- "To an Angel of Pripyat": the poetic photo album – Kyiv, PH "ADEF-Ukraine" with " Center PRIPYAT.com", 2010 г., 40p., in Russian and English languages. – ISBN 978-966-18-7089-4
- At the Crossing: poetry, prose, Kyiv, Publishing house "Kyiv-Mohyla Academy", 2013, 208 pages, in Russian and Ukrainian languages, hardcover.— ISBN 978-966-518-618-2
- Lyubov Sirota "Pripyat birchbark": S-40 Pripyat birchbark / L.M. Sirota, poetry, Kyiv: Prosvita, 2016: ill, 328 pages, in Russian and Ukrainian languages, hardcover. — ISBN 978-617-7201-29-7
- Lyubov Sirota "And while the sky still shines within you or about Freedom, Dignity and Love” : novel, Kyiv, Publishing house "Kyiv-Mohyla Academy", 2024, 224 pages, in Ukrainian languages, hardcover. — ISBN 978-966-518-817-9.
- "Journal of the American Medical Association" JAMA Vol 268, No 5, 5 August 1992 (Lyubov Sirota: page 665)
- The New York Quarterly" – a magazine devoted to the craft of poetry, Number 48, 1992, pages 128 (Lyubov Sirota: page 109) – ISSN 0028-7482 / Library of Congress
- "Life on the Line: Selections on Words and Healing" – Mobile, Alabama: Negative Capability Press, 1992, pages 647 (Lyubov Sirota: Charter VIII “With hope for life”, pages 607 – 626) – ISBN 0-942544-16-1 HBK; ISBN 0-942544-15-3 PBK; Library of Congress Card Number: 91-091330
- "Calyx" – a journal of art and literature, Winter 1992/1993, Volume 14 number 2, pages 126 (Lyubov Sirota: pages 58 – 75)
- "WISE" – World Information Service on Energy, Vol. 449/450, 10 April 1996 (Lyubov Sirota: page 26)
- "The Russell Record Magazine" – Summer 1999, Volume 27/ Number 3 (Lyubov Sirota: page 17)
- "Promin” is published monthly by Ukrainian Woman Association of Canada Vol. XXXVIII April No 4, 1998 (Lyubov Sirota: page 7-9)
- Magazine "Woman's World", Canada
- "Chornobyl' – poruch: Fotoal'bom. Chernobyl Concerns Everyone: Photoalbum. In English and Ukrainian" – Rare Ukrainian Album-Book. (This album contains many photos about Chernobyl Nuclear Power Station accident. Many rare color and black and white photos are included in it.) Published in "Dnipro", Kyiv, 2000, pages 217 (Lyubov Sirota: page 160)
- "A Fierce Brightnesss: Twenty-Five Years of Women's Poetry", Corvallis, Oregon: Calyx Books, 2002, pages 217 (Lyubov Sirota: page 160) – ISBN 0-934971-83-8
- "Perspectives from the Past: Primary Sources in Western Civilizations". W.W. Norton & Company. New York – London. College Book, 1998, Second Edition, Volume 2, pages 628 (Lyubov Sirota: pages 621 – 623) – ISBN 0-393-95879-5 (rbk.)
- "Perspectives from the Past Primary Sources in Western Civilizations". W.W. Norton & Company. New York – London. College Book, 2005 –Third Edition (Volume 2), pages 840 (Lyubov Sirota: pages 828 – 832) – ISBN 0-393-97822-2 (rbk.)
- "In our Own Words. Stories, essays, lyrics &verse from A Generation defining itself", Volume 7, 2007, pages 283 (Lyubov Sirota: pages 248–252) – ISBN 978-0-9654136-9-5
- "The Modern Review" is published quarterly by the Parsifal Press Literary Arts Association. – Volume II / Issue 1, September 2006, pages 172 (Lyubov Sirota: pages 19 – 36), Canada
- Estill Pollok "Available Light", Cinnamon Press, 2007, page 78 (with a collection featuring translations of Russian poet Lyubov Sirota: pages 55 – 78) – ISBN 978-1-905614-06-6
- Chernobyl (Perspectives on Modern World History), Greenhaven; 1 edition (November 20, 2009), (Lyubov Sirota: viewpoint 4 "Poems by a Pripyat" – pages 184 – 188) – ISBN 0-7377-4555-X; ISBN 978-0-7377-4555-9

== Bibliography ==
- Paul Brians “The Chernobyl Poems of Lyubov Sirota"
- Dr. Harash "Voice from the dead Pripyat"
- Ugo Persi "Reflection of ecological thinking in Russian art texts of the 20th century" – the magazine "Russian abroad", 3/2001, Moscow
