= Wenquan Township, Yunnan =

Wenquan Township 温泉乡
- Town
- Location in Yunnan
- Coordinates: 24°41′47″N 99°41′55″E
- Country: People's Republic of China
- Province: Yunnan
- Prefecture-level city: Baoshan
- County: Changning
- Elevation: 1,540 m (5,050 ft)
- Time zone: UTC+8 (China Standard)

Wenquan Township (simplified Chinese: 温泉乡; traditional Chinese: 溫泉鄉; pinyin: Wēnquán Xiāng; lit. 'hot springs') is a township in Changning County in western Yunnan province, China. As of 2011, it has 10 villages under its administration.
