= Scrobipalpa cretigena =

Scientific classification
- Kingdom: Animalia
- Phylum: Arthropoda
- Class: Insecta
- Order: Lepidoptera
- Family: Gelechiidae
- Genus: Scrobipalpa
- Species: S. cretigena

Binomial name
- Scrobipalpa cretigena (Meyrick, 1914)

Synonyms
- Phthorimaea cretigena Meyrick, 1914

Species of moth

Scrobipalpa cretigena is a moth in the family Gelechiidae. It was described by Edward Meyrick in 1914. It is found in South Africa.

The wingspan is about 12 mm (0.47 in). The forewings and hindwings are ochreous whitish.
