= Ephysteris subdiminutella =

Scientific classification
- Kingdom: Animalia
- Phylum: Arthropoda
- Clade: Pancrustacea
- Class: Insecta
- Order: Lepidoptera
- Family: Gelechiidae
- Genus: Ephysteris
- Species: E. subdiminutella

Binomial name
- Ephysteris subdiminutella (Stainton, 1867)

Synonyms
- Aristotelia pulverea Janse, 1950; Gelechia jamaicensis Walsingham, 1897; Gelechia subdiminutella Stainton, 1867; Ochrodia bucolica (Meyrick, 1904); Ochrodia crocoleuca (Meyrick, 1923); Ochrodia ericnista (Meyrick, 1914); Ochrodia extorris (Meyrick, 1923); Ochrodia ferritincta (Turner, 1919); Phthorimaea subdiminutella Stainton, 1867; Phthorimaea jamaicensis (Walsingham); Phthorimaea ochrodeta Meyrick, 1923; Lita zygophyllella Rebel, 1912; Lita unitella Turati, 1930; Aristotelia tribulivora Dumont, 1931; Scrobipalpa turgida Janse, 1951; Gnorimoschema infallax Gozmány, 1960; Gnorimoschema tractatum Gozmány, 1960

Species of moth

Ephysteris subdiminutella is a moth of the family Gelechiidae. It is a widely distributed species, it is known from northern and southern Africa, from Egypt to South Africa, Australia, Palestine, India, Pakistan and Afghanistan. It is also found in the Galápagos Islands.

Known host plants of the larvae of this species include Balanitaceae (Balanites aegyptiaca), Zygophyllaceae (Zygophyllum album) and Rhamnaceae (Zizyphus sp.).
