= Ephysteris =

Scientific classification
- Kingdom: Animalia
- Phylum: Arthropoda
- Clade: Pancrustacea
- Class: Insecta
- Order: Lepidoptera
- Family: Gelechiidae
- Tribe: Gnorimoschemini
- Genus: Ephysteris; Meyrick, 1908

Type species
- Ephysteris chersaea Meyrick, 1908

Diversity
- 87, but see text

Synonyms
- Echinoglossa J.F.G.Clarke, 1965; Epenteris (lapsus); Ephystereris (lapsus); Microcraspedus Janse, 1958; Ochrodia Povolny, 1966; Opacopsis Povolny, 1964 (but see text)

Genus of moths

Ephysteris is a genus of the twirler moth family (Gelechiidae). Among these, it is assigned to tribe Gnorimoschemini of the subfamily Gelechiinae. Even though it is a rather diverse and widespread group, most of these small and inconspicuous moths were overlooked by scientists until the early 20th century. Almost 90 species are known today but new ones are still being discovered.

These moths typically have forewing veins 2 and 3 separate but veins 6-8 originating from a common stalk. Somewhat less characteristically, their labial palps have a pointed tip and a furrow on the second segment.

Ochrodia and Opacopsis were initially established as subgenera of Ephysteris but elevated to full genus status later. However, this is not universally accepted and both are included in the present genus here. Microcraspedus is another subgenus of Ephysteris, to which many of the European species are assigned; Echinoglossa is another. But before any of these can be accepted as subgenus or even distinct genus, the internal systematics of Ephysteris sensu lato are in need of review.

== Species ==
The species of Ephysteris are:

- Subgenus Ephysteris
  - Ephysteris promptella (Staudinger, 1859)
- Subgenus Microcraspedus Janse, 1958
  - Ephysteris deserticolella (Staudinger, 1871)
  - Ephysteris diminutella (Zeller, 1847)
  - Ephysteris iberica Povolny, 1977
  - Ephysteris insulella (Heinemann, 1870)
    - Ephysteris insulella praticolella (Christoph 1872)
  - Ephysteris inustella (Zeller, 1847) (type species of Opacopsis)
    - Ephysteris inustella gredosensis (Rebel 1935)
  - Ephysteris olympica Povolny, 1968
- Unknown subgenus
  - Ephysteris accentella Povolný, 1968
  - Ephysteris aellographa Janse, 1960
  - Ephysteris arabiae Povolný, 1968
  - Ephysteris aulacopis (Meyrick, 1923)
  - Ephysteris brachypogon Meyrick, 1937 (type species of Microcraspedus)
  - Ephysteris brachyptera Karsholt & Sattler, 1998
  - Ephysteris chretieni Povolný, 1968
  - Ephysteris confusa Povolný, 1968
  - Ephysteris curtipennis (Zerny, 1935)
  - Ephysteris cyrenaica Povolný, 1981
  - Ephysteris eremaula (Janse, 1960)
  - Ephysteris flavida Povolný, 1969
  - Ephysteris fontosus (Povolný, 1999)
  - Ephysteris fuscocrossa Janse, 1960
  - Ephysteris gobabebensis Bidzilya & Mey, 2011
  - Ephysteris gondwana Bidzilya & Mey, 2011
  - Ephysteris infirma (Meyrick, 1912)
  - Ephysteris juvenilis (Meyrick, 1929)
  - Ephysteris kasyi Povolný, 1968
  - Ephysteris leptocentra (Meyrick, 1912)
  - Ephysteris longicornis J.F.G.Clarke, 1986
  - Ephysteris montana H.H.Li & Bidzilya, 2008
  - Ephysteris neosirota (Janse, 1950)
  - Ephysteris ornata (Janse, 1950)
  - Ephysteris parasynecta Janse, 1963
  - Ephysteris powelli (Povolný, 1999)
  - Ephysteris riadensis Povolný, 1968
  - Ephysteris ruth Povolný, 1977
  - Ephysteris scimitarella Landry, 2010
  - Ephysteris semiophanes (Meyrick, 1918)
  - Ephysteris silignitis (Turner, 1919)
  - Ephysteris sirota (Meyrick, 1908)
  - Ephysteris speciosa Povolný, 1977
  - Ephysteris sporobolella Landry, 2010
  - Ephysteris suasoria (Meyrick, 1918)
  - Ephysteris subcaerulea (Meyrick, 1918)
  - Ephysteris subovata Povolný, 2001
  - Ephysteris surda (Meyrick, 1923)
  - Ephysteris synecta (Meyrick, 1909)
  - Ephysteris tenuisaccus K.Nupponen, 2010
  - Ephysteris trinota Clarke, 1965 (type species of Echinoglossa)
  - Ephysteris unica Povolný, 1971
  - Ephysteris wenquana H.H.Li & Bidzilya, 2008

== Mostly placed in Ochrodia ==
- Ephysteris pentamacula Janse, 1958
- Ephysteris subdiminutella (Stainton, 1867) (type species of Ochrodia)

== Former species ==
- Ephysteris albocapitella
- Ephysteris atalopis
- Ephysteris australiae
- Ephysteris bucolica
- Ephysteris buvati (Povolny, 1992)
- Ephysteris cacomicra
- Ephysteris chersaea
- Ephysteris coniogramma
- Ephysteris cretigena
- Ephysteris crocoleuca
- Ephysteris delminiliella
- Ephysteris despectella
- Ephysteris dierli
- Ephysteris dispensata
- Ephysteris ericnista
- Ephysteris extorris
- Ephysteris fanatica
- Ephysteris ferritincta
- Ephysteris fluidescens
- Ephysteris foulonsensis Povolny, 1981
- Ephysteris gallica (Povolny, 1992)
- Ephysteris hispanica Povolny, 1981
- Ephysteris infallax
- Ephysteris insularis
- Ephysteris jamaicensis
- Ephysteris lunaki
- Ephysteris monticola
- Ephysteris obstans (Meyrick, 1928)
- Ephysteris ochrodeta
- Ephysteris oschophora
- Ephysteris oxythectis
- Ephysteris paraleuca
- Ephysteris parvula
- Ephysteris petiginella
- Ephysteris pulverea
- Ephysteris sibila
- Ephysteris tractatum
- Ephysteris treskensis Povolny, 1966
- Ephysteris tribulivora
- Ephysteris turgida
- Ephysteris unitella
- Ephysteris xanthorhabda
- Ephysteris zygophyllella
