= Pycnobathra =

Scientific classification
- Kingdom: Animalia
- Phylum: Arthropoda
- Clade: Pancrustacea
- Class: Insecta
- Order: Lepidoptera
- Family: Gelechiidae
- Tribe: Anomologini
- Genus: Pycnobathra; Lower, 1901

Genus of moths

Pycnobathra is a genus of moth in the family Gelechiidae. It was previously treated as a synonym of Megacraspedus.

== Species ==
- Pycnobathra achroa (Lower, 1901)
- Pycnobathra acromelas (Turner, 1919)

== Species mostly placed elsewhere ==
- Pycnobathra aenictodes Turner, 1919
- Pycnobathra aphileta Meyrick, 1904
- Pycnobathra astemphella Meyrick, 1904
- Pycnobathra centrosema Meyrick, 1904
- Pycnobathra chalcoscia Meyrick, 1904
- Pycnobathra clavata Meyrick, 1914
- Pycnobathra coniodes Meyrick, 1904
- Pycnobathra euxena Meyrick, 1904
- Pycnobathra hoplitis Meyrick, 1904
- Pycnobathra inficeta Meyrick, 1904
- Pycnobathra ischnota Meyrick, 1904
- Pycnobathra isotis Meyrick, 1904
- Pycnobathra melitopis Meyrick, 1904
- Pycnobathra niphodes (Lower, 1897)
- Pycnobathra oxyphanes Meyrick, 1904
- Pycnobathra pityritis Meyrick, 1904
- Pycnobathra platyleuca Meyrick, 1904
- Pycnobathra popularis Meyrick, 1904
- Pycnobathra sclerotricha Meyrick, 1904
- Pycnobathra sematacma Meyrick, 1921
- Pycnobathra stratimera (Lower, 1897)
