= Arnaldi =

Arnaldi is an Italian surname. Notable people with the surname include:

- Girolamo Arnaldi (1929–2016), Italian historian
- Matteo Arnaldi (born 2001), Italian tennis player
- Rinaldo Arnaldi (1914–1944), Italian Resistance member

== See also ==
- Arnaldo, given name
- Castrum Arnaldi, castle in Israel
- Megacraspedus arnaldi, species of moth
- Villa Arnaldi, historical edifice in Vicenza, Italy
