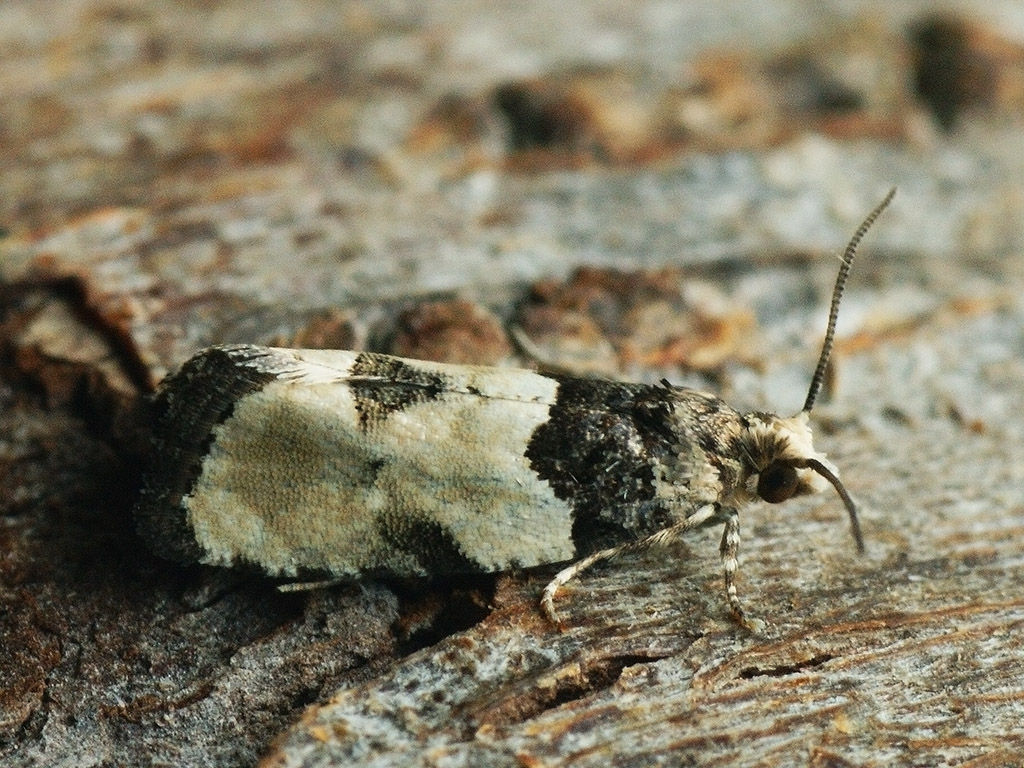

Scientific classification
- Kingdom: Animalia
- Phylum: Arthropoda
- Class: Insecta
- Order: Lepidoptera
- Family: Tortricidae
- Genus: Gibberifera
- Species: G. simplana

Binomial name
- Gibberifera simplana (Fischer v. Röslerstamm, 1836)

Synonyms
- Penthina simplana Fischer v. Röslerstamm, 1836

= Gibberifera simplana =

Species of moth

Gibberifera simplana, the least bell, is a species of moth of the family Tortricidae. It is found in China (Hebei, Jilin, Henan, Hubei, Hunan, Shaanxi, Gansu), Taiwan, Korea, Japan, Russia and Europe, where it has been recorded from Great Britain, France, the Benelux, Germany, Denmark, Austria, Switzerland, Italy, the Czech Republic, Slovakia, Poland, Hungary, Romania, Norway, Sweden, Finland and the Baltic region.

The wingspan is 14–16 mm. Adults are on wing from May to July.

The larvae feed on Populus tremula and Salix species.
