= Megacraspedus majorella =

Scientific classification
- Domain: Eukaryota
- Kingdom: Animalia
- Phylum: Arthropoda
- Class: Insecta
- Order: Lepidoptera
- Family: Gelechiidae
- Genus: Megacraspedus
- Species: M. majorella

Binomial name
- Megacraspedus majorella Caradja, 1920

Species of moth

Megacraspedus majorella is a moth of the family Gelechiidae. It was described by Aristide Caradja in 1920. It is found in Russia's Alai Mountains.

Adults are nearly identical to Megacraspedus imparellus, but bigger and the two dots in the cell are further apart.
