= Megacraspedus separatellus =

Scientific classification
- Kingdom: Animalia
- Phylum: Arthropoda
- Class: Insecta
- Order: Lepidoptera
- Family: Gelechiidae
- Genus: Megacraspedus
- Species: M. separatellus

Binomial name
- Megacraspedus separatellus (Fischer von Röslerstamm, 1843)

Synonyms
- Ypsolophus separatellus Fischer von Röslerstamm, 1843

Species of moth

Megacraspedus separatellus is a moth of the family Gelechiidae. It is found from central and southern Europe to the Ural Mountains. Outside Europe it is found in the Altai Mountains, Turkey and the Caucasus.

Females are brachypterous.
