= Gibberifera monticola =

Scientific classification
- Kingdom: Animalia
- Phylum: Arthropoda
- Class: Insecta
- Order: Lepidoptera
- Family: Tortricidae
- Genus: Gibberifera
- Species: G. monticola

Binomial name
- Gibberifera monticola Kuznetsov, 1971

Species of moth

Gibberifera monticola is a species of moth of the family Tortricidae. It is found in China (Sichuan, Yunnan).

The wingspan is 15–17 mm.
