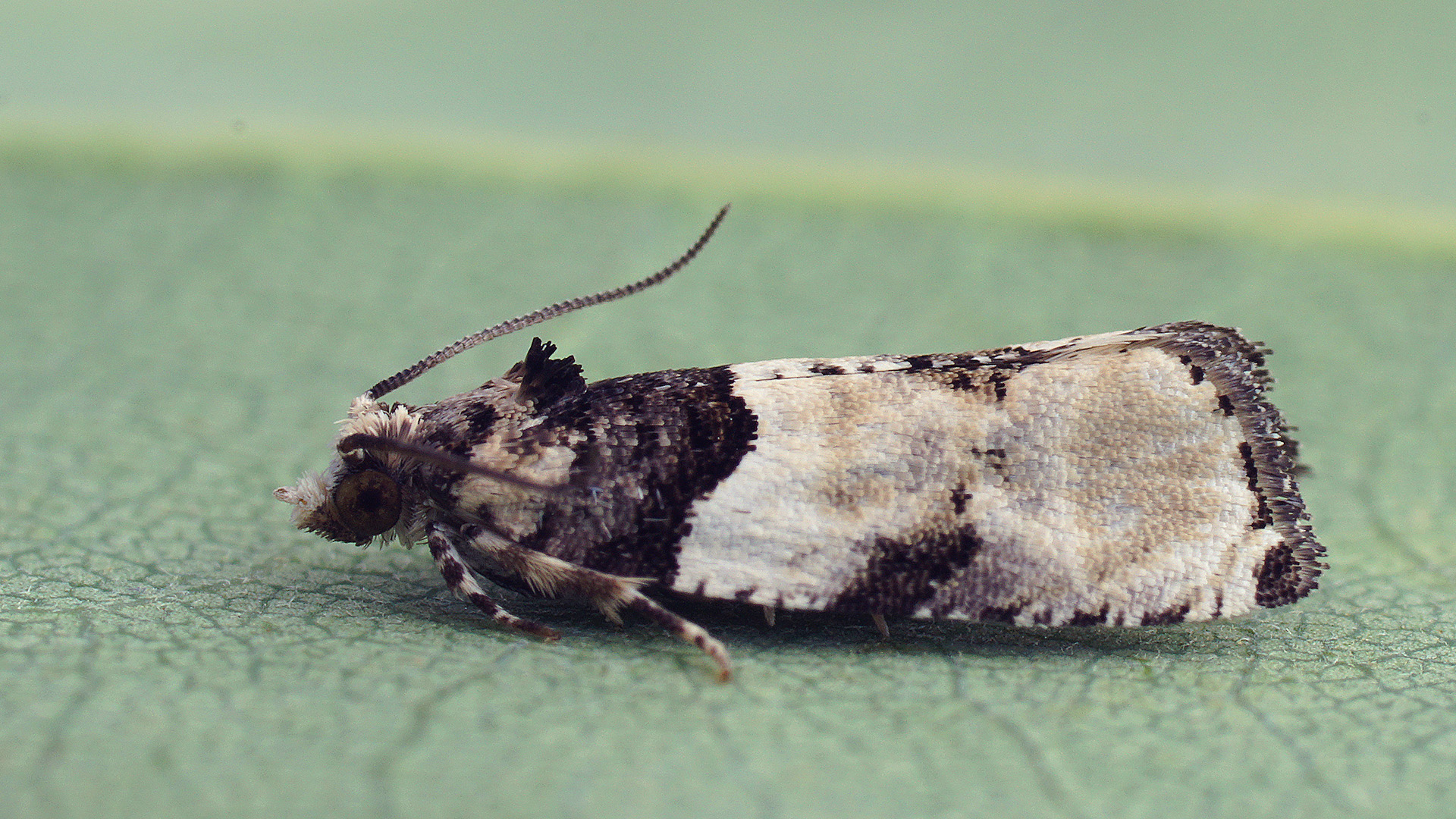
- Gibberifera simplana

Scientific classification
- Domain: Eukaryota
- Kingdom: Animalia
- Phylum: Arthropoda
- Class: Insecta
- Order: Lepidoptera
- Family: Tortricidae
- Tribe: Eucosmini
- Genus: Gibberifera; Obraztsov, 1946

Synonyms
- Gibberelifera Byun & Park, 1994

= Gibberifera =

Genus of tortrix moths

Gibberifera is a genus of moths belonging to the subfamily Olethreutinae of the family Tortricidae.

== Species ==
- Gibberifera alba Kawabe & Nasu, 1994
- Gibberifera angkhangensis Kawabe & Nasu, 1994
- Gibberifera clavata Zhang & Li, 2004
- Gibberifera glaciata Meyrick, 1907
- Gibberifera hepaticana Kawabe & Nasu, 1994
- Gibberifera mienshana Kuznetzov, 1971
- Gibberifera monticola Kuznetzov, 1971
- Gibberifera nigrovena Kawabe & Nasu, 1994
- Gibberifera obscura Diakonoff, 1964
- Gibberifera qingchengensis Nasu & Liu, 1996
- Gibberifera similis Kuznetzov, 1971
- Gibberifera simplana Fischer von Rslerstamm, 1836
- Gibberifera yadongensis Nasu & Liu, 1996

== See also ==
- List of Tortricidae genera
