= Gibberifera similis =

Scientific classification
- Domain: Eukaryota
- Kingdom: Animalia
- Phylum: Arthropoda
- Class: Insecta
- Order: Lepidoptera
- Family: Tortricidae
- Genus: Gibberifera
- Species: G. similis

Binomial name
- Gibberifera similis Kuznetzov, 1971

Synonyms
- Gypsonoma similis

Species of moth

Gibberifera similis is a species of moth of the family Tortricidae. It is found in Shaanxi, China.
