= Megacraspedus monolorellus =

Scientific classification
- Domain: Eukaryota
- Kingdom: Animalia
- Phylum: Arthropoda
- Class: Insecta
- Order: Lepidoptera
- Family: Gelechiidae
- Genus: Megacraspedus
- Species: M. monolorellus

Binomial name
- Megacraspedus monolorellus Rebel, 1905

Species of insect

Megacraspedus monolorellus is a moth of the family Gelechiidae. It was described by Hans Rebel in 1905. It is found in Asia Minor.

The wingspan is 13–16 mm (0.51–0.63 in). The forewings are irrorared with dark brownish-grey with a whitish streak along the margin, narrowing towards the base. The hindwings are deep grey.
