= Megacraspedus fallax =

Scientific classification
- Domain: Eukaryota
- Kingdom: Animalia
- Phylum: Arthropoda
- Class: Insecta
- Order: Lepidoptera
- Family: Gelechiidae
- Genus: Megacraspedus
- Species: M. fallax

Binomial name
- Megacraspedus fallax (Mann, 1867)

Synonyms
- Chilopselaphus fallax Mann, 1867; Trichembola neurophanes Meyrick, 1926

Species of moth

Megacraspedus fallax is a moth of the family Gelechiidae. It is found in France, Spain, Hungary, southern Ukraine, Russia (southern Ural, Volga region, southern Siberia), the Caucasus and from Kazakhstan to north-western China.

The wingspan is 17 mm (0.67 in). The forewings are pale ochreous-yellowish with the markings consisting of shining white edged lines of dark fuscous irroration (speckling). There is a streak from the base just beneath the costa to the costa at two-thirds, with a narrower streak rising out of this along the upper margin of cell to just beneath the apex (the area between this and the preceding wholly irrorated dark fuscous), another along the lower margin of the cell and transverse vein, another along the fold throughout, and irregular lines along veins two to five, seven and eight. The dorsal edge is finely white. The hindwings are whitish.
