= Megacraspedus lativalvellus =

Scientific classification
- Domain: Eukaryota
- Kingdom: Animalia
- Phylum: Arthropoda
- Class: Insecta
- Order: Lepidoptera
- Family: Gelechiidae
- Genus: Megacraspedus
- Species: M. lativalvellus

Binomial name
- Megacraspedus lativalvellus Amsel, 1954

Species of moth

Megacraspedus lativalvellus is a moth of the family Gelechiidae. It was described by Hans Georg Amsel in 1954. It is found on Malta.
