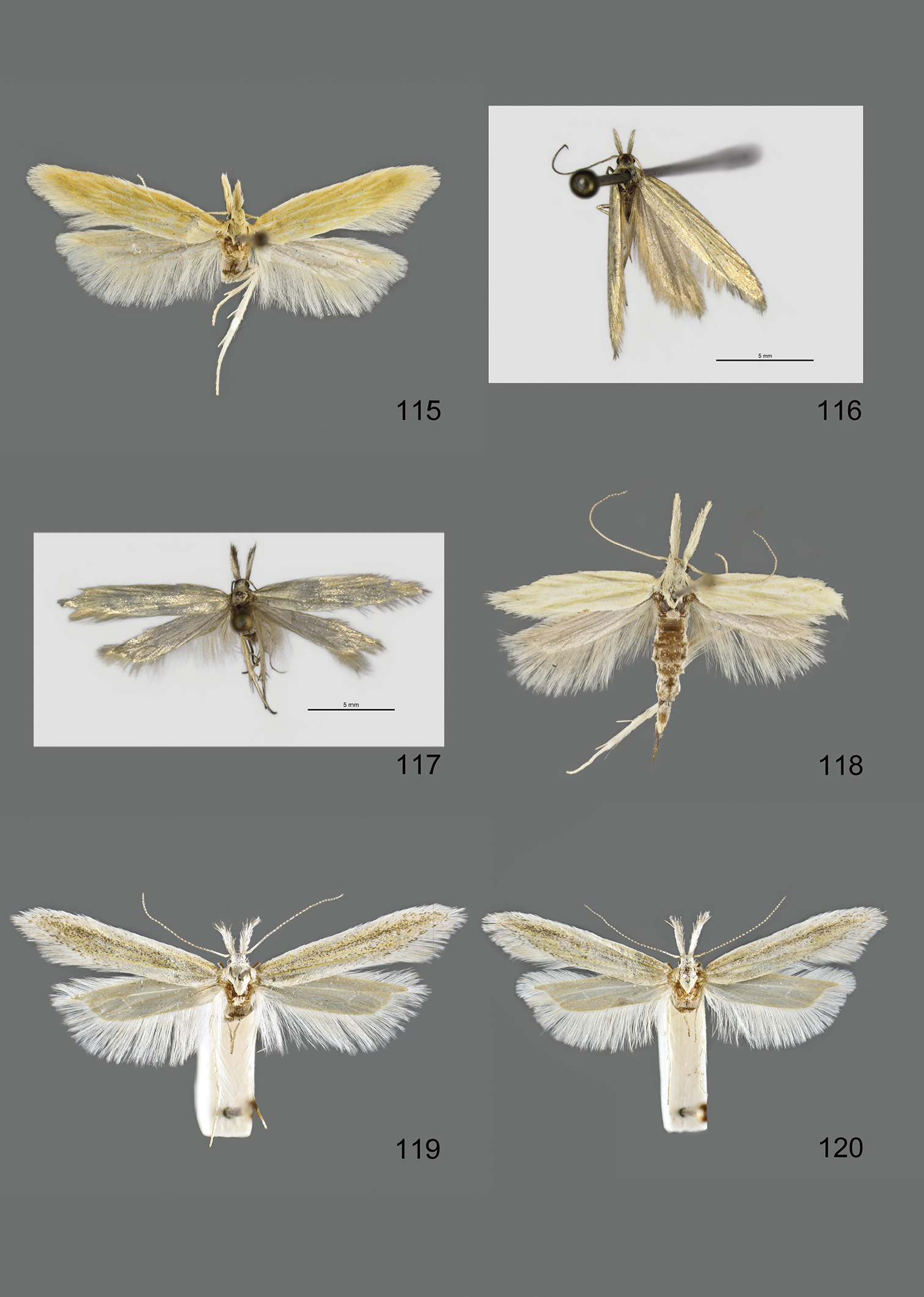

Scientific classification
- Kingdom: Animalia
- Phylum: Arthropoda
- Clade: Pancrustacea
- Class: Insecta
- Order: Lepidoptera
- Family: Gelechiidae
- Genus: Megacraspedus
- Species: M. lagopellus

Binomial name
- Megacraspedus lagopellus Herrich-Schäffer, 1860

Synonyms
- Chilopselaphus lagopellus

= Megacraspedus lagopellus =

Species of moth

Megacraspedus lagopellus is a moth of the family Gelechiidae. It is found in Russia (Lower Volga, southern Ural) and Hungary.
