= Megacraspedus consortiella =

Scientific classification
- Domain: Eukaryota
- Kingdom: Animalia
- Phylum: Arthropoda
- Class: Insecta
- Order: Lepidoptera
- Family: Gelechiidae
- Genus: Megacraspedus
- Species: M. consortiella

Binomial name
- Megacraspedus consortiella Caradja, 1920

Species of moth

Megacraspedus consortiella is a moth of the family Gelechiidae. It was described by Aristide Caradja in 1920. It is found in Russia's Alai Mountains.

The forewings are mouse-grey with the costa white from one-third to the apex. The hindwings are mouse-grey.
