= Megacraspedus ethicodes =

Scientific classification
- Kingdom: Animalia
- Phylum: Arthropoda
- Class: Insecta
- Order: Lepidoptera
- Family: Gelechiidae
- Genus: Megacraspedus
- Species: M. ethicodes

Binomial name
- Megacraspedus ethicodes (Meyrick, 1920)

Synonyms
- Chilopselaphus ethicodes Meyrick, 1920

Species of moth

Megacraspedus ethicodes is a moth of the family Gelechiidae. It was described by Edward Meyrick in 1920. It is found in Kenya.
