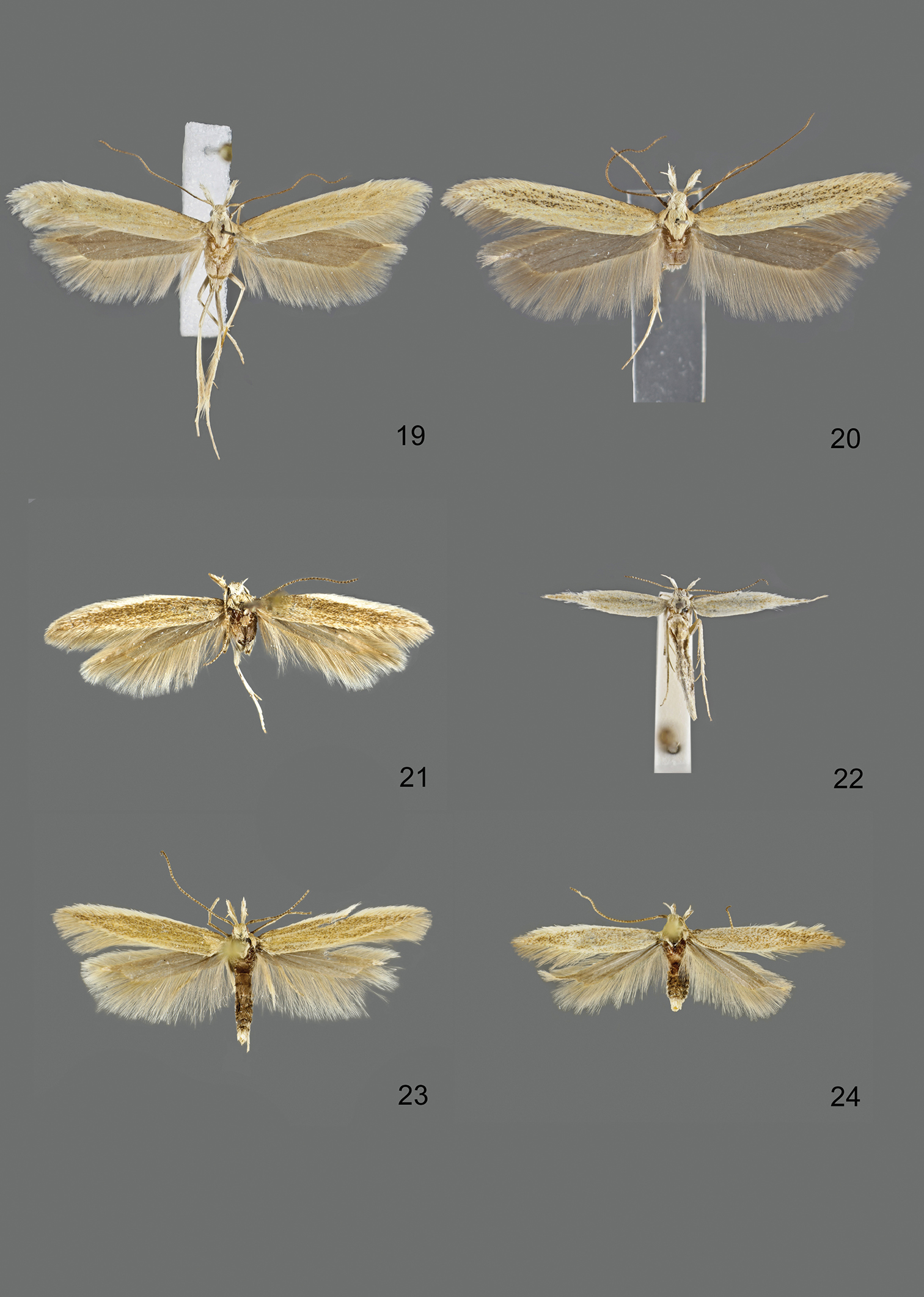
- Megacraspedus homochroa (no. 20)

Scientific classification
- Domain: Eukaryota
- Kingdom: Animalia
- Phylum: Arthropoda
- Class: Insecta
- Order: Lepidoptera
- Family: Gelechiidae
- Genus: Megacraspedus
- Species: M. homochroa

Binomial name
- Megacraspedus homochroa Le Cerf, 1932

= Megacraspedus homochroa =

Species of moth

Megacraspedus homochroa is a moth of the family Gelechiidae. It was described by Ferdinand Le Cerf in 1932. It is found in Morocco.
