= Megacraspedus pusillus =

Scientific classification
- Domain: Eukaryota
- Kingdom: Animalia
- Phylum: Arthropoda
- Class: Insecta
- Order: Lepidoptera
- Family: Gelechiidae
- Genus: Megacraspedus
- Species: M. pusillus

Binomial name
- Megacraspedus pusillus Walsingham, 1903

Species of moth

Megacraspedus pusillus is a moth of the family Gelechiidae. It was described by Thomas de Grey, 6th Baron Walsingham, in 1903. It is found in Spain.

The wingspan is 11–12 mm (0.43–0.47 in). The forewings are brownish grey, dusted with pale cinereous and devoid of markings, with the exception of a small blackish spot at the end of the cell. The hindwings are pale grey.
