= Megacraspedus longipalpella =

Scientific classification
- Kingdom: Animalia
- Phylum: Arthropoda
- Clade: Pancrustacea
- Class: Insecta
- Order: Lepidoptera
- Family: Gelechiidae
- Genus: Megacraspedus
- Species: M. longipalpella

Binomial name
- Megacraspedus longipalpella Junnilainen, 2010

Species of moth

Megacraspedus longipalpella is a moth of the family Gelechiidae. It is found in Russia (the southern Ural and Lower Volga). The habitat consists of grassy lowland steppes.

The wingspan is 18–20 mm. Adults are on wing from early June to early August.
