= Megacraspedus litovalvellus =

Scientific classification
- Kingdom: Animalia
- Phylum: Arthropoda
- Clade: Pancrustacea
- Class: Insecta
- Order: Lepidoptera
- Family: Gelechiidae
- Genus: Megacraspedus
- Species: M. litovalvellus

Binomial name
- Megacraspedus litovalvellus Junnilainen, 2010

Species of moth

Megacraspedus litovalvellus is a moth of the family Gelechiidae. It is found in Russia (the southern Ural). The habitat consists of chalk steppes.

The wingspan is 14–16 mm for males and about 10 mm for females. Adults are on wing from May to early August.
