= Megacraspedus argyroneurellus =

Scientific classification
- Kingdom: Animalia
- Phylum: Arthropoda
- Class: Insecta
- Order: Lepidoptera
- Family: Gelechiidae
- Genus: Megacraspedus
- Species: M. argyroneurellus

Binomial name
- Megacraspedus argyroneurellus Staudinger, 1876

Species of moth

Megacraspedus argyroneurellus is a moth of the family Gelechiidae. It is found in Russia (Lower Volga, southern Ural), Ukraine (the Crimea), Central Asia, the northern Caucasus and Turkey.
