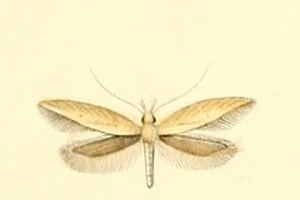

Scientific classification
- Domain: Eukaryota
- Kingdom: Animalia
- Phylum: Arthropoda
- Class: Insecta
- Order: Lepidoptera
- Family: Gelechiidae
- Genus: Megacraspedus
- Species: M. binotella

Binomial name
- Megacraspedus binotella (Duponchel, 1843)

Synonyms
- Palpula binotella Duponchel, 1843; Ypsolophus binotellus Fischer von Röslerstamm, 1843

= Megacraspedus binotella =

Species of moth

Megacraspedus binotella is a moth of the family Gelechiidae. It was described by Philogène Auguste Joseph Duponchel in 1843. It is found in Spain, Germany, Austria, Italy, the Czech Republic, Slovakia, Poland, Albania, Bosnia and Herzegovina, Bulgaria, Hungary, North Macedonia, Greece, Ukraine and Russia.
