= Megacraspedus kaszabianus =

Scientific classification
- Kingdom: Animalia
- Phylum: Arthropoda
- Clade: Pancrustacea
- Class: Insecta
- Order: Lepidoptera
- Family: Gelechiidae
- Genus: Megacraspedus
- Species: M. kaszabianus

Binomial name
- Megacraspedus kaszabianus Povolný, 1982

Species of moth

Megacraspedus kaszabianus is a moth of the family Gelechiidae. It was described by Povolný in 1982. It is found in Mongolia.
