= Gibberifera mienshana =

Scientific classification
- Domain: Eukaryota
- Kingdom: Animalia
- Phylum: Arthropoda
- Class: Insecta
- Order: Lepidoptera
- Family: Tortricidae
- Genus: Gibberifera
- Species: G. mienshana

Binomial name
- Gibberifera mienshana Kuznetsov, 1971

Species of moth

Gibberifera mienshana is a species of moth of the family Tortricidae. It is found in China (Shanxi) and the Russian Far East.
