= Pycnobathra acromelas =

Scientific classification
- Domain: Eukaryota
- Kingdom: Animalia
- Phylum: Arthropoda
- Class: Insecta
- Order: Lepidoptera
- Family: Gelechiidae
- Genus: Pycnobathra
- Species: P. acromelas

Binomial name
- Pycnobathra acromelas (Turner, 1919)

Synonyms
- Nothris acromelas Turner, 1919; Xerometra acromelas

Species of moth

Pycnobathra acromelas is a moth of the family Gelechiidae. It is found in Australia, where it has been recorded from New South Wales.

The wingspan is about 14 mm. The forewings are whitish with a slight brownish suffusion. The discal dots and a few scattered scales are blackish and the first discal is found at one-third, the second at two-thirds and the plical well beyond the first discal. There is a small irregular apical blackish spot, with some marginal blackish dots on the costa towards the apex and on the termen. The hindwings are grey.
