= Megacraspedus tutti =

Scientific classification
- Domain: Eukaryota
- Kingdom: Animalia
- Phylum: Arthropoda
- Class: Insecta
- Order: Lepidoptera
- Family: Gelechiidae
- Genus: Megacraspedus
- Species: M. tutti

Binomial name
- Megacraspedus tutti Walsingham, 1887

Species of moth

Megacraspedus tutti is a moth of the family Gelechiidae. It was described by Thomas de Grey, 6th Baron Walsingham, in 1887. It is found in France.

The wingspan is about 18 mm (0.71 in). The forewings are mouse-grey, with very faint indications of paler lines following the neuration. These are scarcely distinguishable except along the upper margin of the cell. The costa is narrowly whitish from the base to the middle of the costal cilia. The hindwings are pale-grey.
