= Megacraspedus alfacarellus =

Scientific classification
- Domain: Eukaryota
- Kingdom: Animalia
- Phylum: Arthropoda
- Class: Insecta
- Order: Lepidoptera
- Family: Gelechiidae
- Genus: Megacraspedus
- Species: M. alfacarellus

Binomial name
- Megacraspedus alfacarellus Wehrli, 1926

Species of moth

Megacraspedus alfacarellus is a moth of the family Gelechiidae. It was described by Wehrli in 1926. It is found in Spain.
