= Rinaldo Arnaldi =

Italian Resistance member (1914–1944)

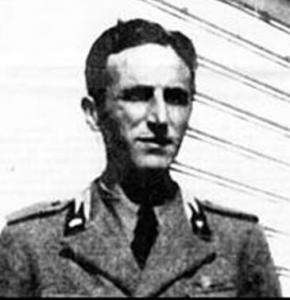
- Born: 19 June 1914; Dueville, Kingdom of Italy
- Died: 6 September 1944 (aged 30); Asiago plateau, Italian Social Republic
- Military career
- Allegiance: Kingdom of Italy
- Branch: Royal Italian Army
- Service years: 1940–1943
- Rank: Sergeant major
- Conflicts: World War II
- Awards: Gold Medal of Military Valour (posthumous)

Rinaldo Arnaldi (Dueville, 19 June 1914 – Asiago plateau, 6 September 1944) was an Italian Resistance member during World War II. In 1983, he was recognized by Israel as Righteous Among the Nations for his efforts to help Italian Jews escape persecutions in Nazi-occupied northern Italy.

== Biography ==
He was born in 1914 in Dueville, province of Vicenza, the son of a clerk known for being a staunch anti-fascist. In 1940, after obtaining two degrees in economics and political science in Venice, despite the persecution of his father by the Fascist regime, he volunteered to join the Royal Italian Army following the outbreak of the Second World War, becoming a tanker and reaching the rank of sergeant major. At the proclamation of the Armistice of Cassibile, on 8 September 1943, he was stationed in Vicenza, and along with a group of comrades he escaped capture by the German forces and founded the first partisan group on the Asiago plateau, named "Mazzini" Partisan Brigade, of which he became political commissar and later deputy commander (the Brigade later became part of the "Monte Ortigara" Alpine Division). He took the nom de guerre "Loris".

In the following months, Rinaldi participated in several actions against the German occupiers and their Fascist allies, sabotage actions on rail lines, roads, power lines and telephone lines, and led Jews fleeing Nazi persecution across the border to Switzerland, along with downed Allied airmen and escaped prisoners of war, with the help of his sister Maria, mountain guide Gino Soldà, Christian Democrat partisan Torquatro Fraccon and priest Antonio Frigo. For these activities, he would be recognized as Righteous Among the Nations in 1983.

In September 1944 the head of the SS in Italy, Obergruppenführer Karl Wolff, despatched the 263rd Ost-Bataillon as well as SS and police troops to suppress the partisan movement in the area of the Asiago plateau. On 6 September, Arnaldi and his partisans were ambushed by German troops in the woods of Granezza; Arnaldi was killed in combat along with twenty-two of his men. He was posthumously awarded the Gold Medal of Military Valor.
