= Gibberifera hepaticana =

Scientific classification
- Kingdom: Animalia
- Phylum: Arthropoda
- Class: Insecta
- Order: Lepidoptera
- Family: Tortricidae
- Genus: Gibberifera
- Species: G. hepaticana

Binomial name
- Gibberifera hepaticana Kawabe & Nasu, 1994

Species of moth

Gibberifera hepaticana is a species of moth of the family Tortricidae. It is found in China (Sichuan, Guizhou) and Japan.

The wingspan is 12–18 mm.
