= Megacraspedus incertellus =

Scientific classification
- Domain: Eukaryota
- Kingdom: Animalia
- Phylum: Arthropoda
- Class: Insecta
- Order: Lepidoptera
- Family: Gelechiidae
- Genus: Megacraspedus
- Species: M. incertellus

Binomial name
- Megacraspedus incertellus Rebel, 1930

Species of moth

Megacraspedus incertellus is a moth of the family Gelechiidae. It was described by Hans Rebel in 1930. It is found in the border region of Bulgaria and Greece.

The length of the forewings is 7–8 mm (0.28–0.31 in). The forewings are light brownish with a narrow white stripe at the margin.
