= Megacraspedus peyerimhoffi =

Scientific classification
- Domain: Eukaryota
- Kingdom: Animalia
- Phylum: Arthropoda
- Class: Insecta
- Order: Lepidoptera
- Family: Gelechiidae
- Genus: Megacraspedus
- Species: M. peyerimhoffi

Binomial name
- Megacraspedus peyerimhoffi Le Cerf, 1925

Species of moth

Megacraspedus peyerimhoffi is a moth of the family Gelechiidae. It was described by Ferdinand Le Cerf in 1925. It is found in Algeria.
