= Megacraspedus culminicola =

Scientific classification
- Domain: Eukaryota
- Kingdom: Animalia
- Phylum: Arthropoda
- Class: Insecta
- Order: Lepidoptera
- Family: Gelechiidae
- Genus: Megacraspedus
- Species: M. culminicola

Binomial name
- Megacraspedus culminicola Le Cerf, 1932

Species of moth

Megacraspedus culminicola is a moth of the family Gelechiidae. It was described by Ferdinand Le Cerf in 1932. It is found in Morocco.
