= Megacraspedus tristictus =

Scientific classification
- Domain: Eukaryota
- Kingdom: Animalia
- Phylum: Arthropoda
- Class: Insecta
- Order: Lepidoptera
- Family: Gelechiidae
- Genus: Megacraspedus
- Species: M. tristictus

Binomial name
- Megacraspedus tristictus Walsingham, 1910

Synonyms
- Megacraspedus tristicus

Species of moth

Megacraspedus tristictus is a moth of the family Gelechiidae. It was described by Walsingham in 1910. It is found in southern France and Italy.

The wingspan is about 12 mm (0.47 in). The forewings are uniform pale ochreous, with two black spots, one in the fold and one at the end of the cell, with a stronger spot on the disc equidistant between them. The hindwings are pale grey.
