= Megacraspedus pentheres =

Scientific classification
- Domain: Eukaryota
- Kingdom: Animalia
- Phylum: Arthropoda
- Class: Insecta
- Order: Lepidoptera
- Family: Gelechiidae
- Genus: Megacraspedus
- Species: M. pentheres

Binomial name
- Megacraspedus pentheres Walsingham, 1920

Species of moth

Megacraspedus pentheres is a moth of the family Gelechiidae. It was described by Thomas de Grey, 6th Baron Walsingham, in 1920. It is found in southern France.

The wingspan is about 10 mm (0.39 in). The forewings are stone-whitish, dusted with brownish cinereous and with minute black speckling around the outer third of the costa, continuing around the apex and along the dorsum to within one-third of the base. There are also three small, elongate, black dots, one in the fold beyond the middle, another slightly above and beyond it on the disc, and a third in the same line with the latter, about the end of the cell. The middle spot is equidistant between the other two. The hindwings are shining, pale bluish grey.
