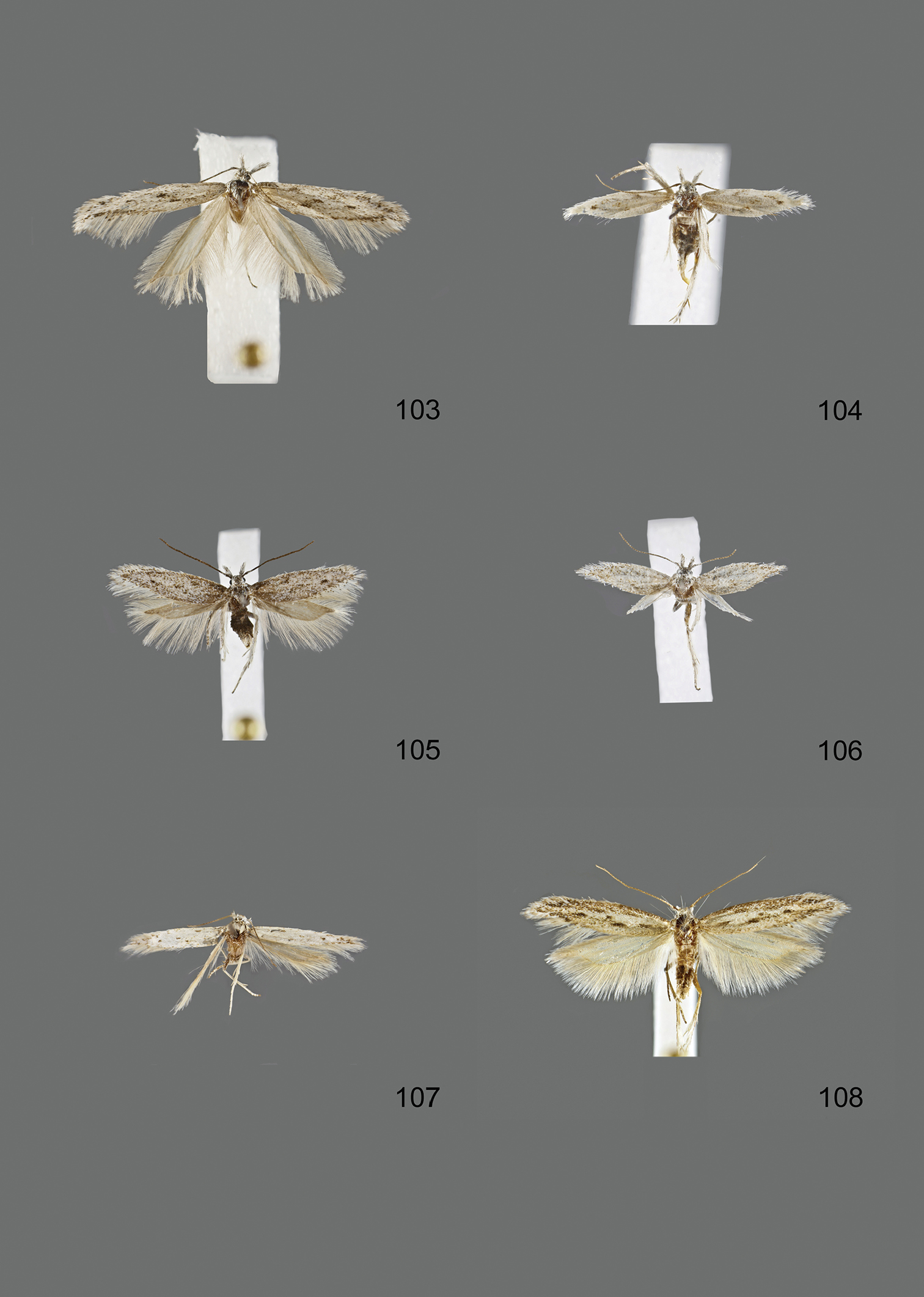
- Megacraspedus (10.3897-zookeys.800.26292) Figures 103–108

Scientific classification
- Kingdom: Animalia
- Phylum: Arthropoda
- Clade: Pancrustacea
- Class: Insecta
- Order: Lepidoptera
- Family: Gelechiidae
- Genus: Megacraspedus
- Species: M. multispinella

Binomial name
- Megacraspedus multispinella Junnilainen & Nupponen, 2010

= Megacraspedus multispinella =

Species of moth

Megacraspedus multispinella is a moth of the family Gelechiidae. It is found in Russia (the southern Ural). The habitat consists of rocky steppe slopes with lush low vegetation.

The wingspan is 11.5–13 mm.
