= Megacraspedus subdolellus =

Scientific classification
- Domain: Eukaryota
- Kingdom: Animalia
- Phylum: Arthropoda
- Class: Insecta
- Order: Lepidoptera
- Family: Gelechiidae
- Genus: Megacraspedus
- Species: M. subdolellus

Binomial name
- Megacraspedus subdolellus Staudinger, 1859

Species of moth

Megacraspedus subdolellus is a moth of the family Gelechiidae. It was described by Otto Staudinger in 1859. It is found in Portugal, Spain and France.

The wingspan is 15–18 mm (0.59–0.71 in). The forewings are dirty straw-yellow, with a white margin especially towards the tip. There are whitish-pearl longitudinal stripes in the middle.
