= Megacraspedus cerussatellus =

Scientific classification
- Domain: Eukaryota
- Kingdom: Animalia
- Phylum: Arthropoda
- Class: Insecta
- Order: Lepidoptera
- Family: Gelechiidae
- Genus: Megacraspedus
- Species: M. cerussatellus

Binomial name
- Megacraspedus cerussatellus Rebel, 1930

Species of moth

Megacraspedus cerussatellus is a moth of the family Gelechiidae. It was described by Hans Rebel in 1930. It is found in the border area between Bulgaria and Greece.

The wingspan is 11–13 mm (0.43–0.51 in).
