= Megacraspedus grossisquammellus =

Scientific classification
- Domain: Eukaryota
- Kingdom: Animalia
- Phylum: Arthropoda
- Class: Insecta
- Order: Lepidoptera
- Family: Gelechiidae
- Genus: Megacraspedus
- Species: M. grossisquammellus

Binomial name
- Megacraspedus grossisquammellus Chrétien, 1925

Species of moth

Megacraspedus grossisquammellus is a moth of the family Gelechiidae. It was described by Pierre Chrétien in 1925. It is found in Spain.

The wingspan is 15–16 mm (0.59–0.63 in). The forewings are ochreous yellow with brownish scales. The hindwings are whitish.
