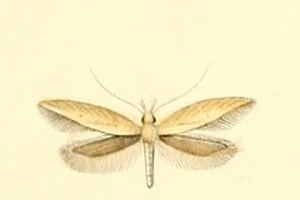
- Megacraspedus binotella

Scientific classification
- Kingdom: Animalia
- Phylum: Arthropoda
- Clade: Pancrustacea
- Class: Insecta
- Order: Lepidoptera
- Family: Gelechiidae
- Subfamily: Anomologinae
- Genus: Megacraspedus; Zeller, 1839

Synonyms
- Neda Chambers, 1874 (preocc Mulsant, 1850); Autoneda Busck, 1903; Toxoceras Chrétien, 1915; Chilopselaphus Mann, 1867; Toxidoceras Chrétien, 1923; Cauloecista Dumont, 1928

= Megacraspedus =

Genus of moths

Megacraspedus is a genus of moths in the family Gelechiidae, found primarily in the Palearctic.

== Species ==
The following species belong to the genus Megacraspedus:

- Megacraspedus albella (Amsel, 1935)
- Megacraspedus albovenata Junnilainen, 2010^{g}
- Megacraspedus alfacarellus Wehrli, 1926^{c g}
- Megacraspedus andreneli Varenne & Nel, 2014^{g}
- Megacraspedus argyroneurellus Staudinger, 1871^{c g}
- Megacraspedus armatophallus Huemer & Karsholt, 2018
- Megacraspedus attritellus Staudinger, 1871^{c g}
- Megacraspedus balneariellus (Chrétien, 1907)^{g}
- Megacraspedus barcodiellus Huemer & Karsholt, 2018
- Megacraspedus bengtssoni Huemer & Karsholt, 2018
- Megacraspedus bidentatus Huemer & Karsholt, 2018
- Megacraspedus bilineatella Huemer & Karsholt, 1996^{g}
- Megacraspedus binotella (Duponchel, 1843)^{g}
- Megacraspedus brachypteris Huemer & Karsholt, 2018
- Megacraspedus cerussatellus Rebel, 1930^{c g}
- Megacraspedus coleophorodes (Li & Zheng, 1995)
- Megacraspedus consortiella Caradja, 1920^{c g}
- Megacraspedus cuencellus Caradja, 1920^{c g}
- Megacraspedus dejectella (Staudinger, 1859)^{g}
- Megacraspedus devorator Huemer & Karsholt, 2018
- Megacraspedus dolosellus (Zeller, 1839)^{c g}
- Megacraspedus eburnellus Huemer & Karsholt, 2001^{g}
- Megacraspedus ethicodes (Meyrick, 1920)
- Megacraspedus fallax (Mann, 1867)^{g}
- Megacraspedus faunierensis Huemer & Karsholt, 2018
- Megacraspedus feminensis Huemer & Karsholt, 2018
- Megacraspedus fuscus Huemer & Karsholt, 2018
- Megacraspedus gallicus Huemer & Karsholt, 2018
- Megacraspedus gibeauxi Huemer & Karsholt, 2018
- Megacraspedus glaberipalpus Huemer & Karsholt, 2018
- Megacraspedus golestanicus Huemer & Karsholt, 2018
- Megacraspedus granadensis Huemer & Karsholt, 2018
- Megacraspedus gredosensis Huemer & Karsholt, 2018
- Megacraspedus grisea (Filipjev, 1931)
- Megacraspedus heckfordi Huemer & Karsholt, 2018
- Megacraspedus homochroa Le Cerf, 1932^{c g}
- Megacraspedus ibericus Huemer & Karsholt, 2018
- Megacraspedus imparellus (Fischer von Röslerstamm, 1843)^{c g}
- Megacraspedus junnilaineni Huemer & Karsholt, 2018
- Megacraspedus kazakhstanicus Huemer & Karsholt, 2018
- Megacraspedus kirgizicus Huemer & Karsholt, 2018
- Megacraspedus knudlarseni Huemer & Karsholt, 2018
- Megacraspedus korabicus Huemer & Karsholt, 2018
- Megacraspedus lagopellus Herrich-Schäffer, 1860^{c g}
- Megacraspedus lanceolellus (Zeller, 1850)^{g}
- Megacraspedus laseni Timossi & Huemer, 2021
- Megacraspedus latiuncus Huemer & Karsholt, 2018
- Megacraspedus lativalvellus Amsel, 1954^{c g}
- Megacraspedus leuca (Filipjev, 1929)
- Megacraspedus libycus Huemer & Karsholt, 2018
- Megacraspedus litovalvellus Junnilainen, 2010^{g}
- Megacraspedus longipalpella Junnilainen, 2010^{g}
- Megacraspedus longivalvellus Huemer & Karsholt, 2018
- Megacraspedus macrocanellus Lucas, 1932
- Megacraspedus majorella Caradja, 1920^{c g}
- Megacraspedus monolorellus Rebel, 1905^{c g}
- Megacraspedus multipunctellus Huemer & Karsholt, 2018
- Megacraspedus multispinella Junnilainen & Nupponen, 2010^{g}
- Megacraspedus neli Huemer & Karsholt, 2018
- Megacraspedus niphorrhoa (Meyrick, 1926)^{g}
- Megacraspedus numidellus (Chrétien, 1915)
- Megacraspedus nupponeni Huemer & Karsholt, 2018
- Megacraspedus occidentellus Huemer & Karsholt, 2018
- Megacraspedus orenburgensis Junnilainen & Nupponen, 2010^{g}
- Megacraspedus pacificus Huemer & Karsholt, 2018
- Megacraspedus pentheres Walsingham, 1920^{c g}
- Megacraspedus peslieri Huemer & Karsholt, 2018
- Megacraspedus peyerimhoffi Le Cerf, 1925^{c g}
- Megacraspedus podolicus (Toll, 1942)
- Megacraspedus pototskii Huemer & Karsholt, 2018
- Megacraspedus pusillus Walsingham, 1903^{c g}
- Megacraspedus quadristictus Lhomme, 1946
- Megacraspedus ribbeella (Caradja, 1920)
- Megacraspedus serica Meyrick, 1909^{c g}
- Megacraspedus similellus Huemer & Karsholt, 2018
- Megacraspedus skoui Huemer & Karsholt, 2018
- Megacraspedus skulei Huemer & Karsholt, 2018
- Megacraspedus spinophallus Huemer & Karsholt, 2018
- Megacraspedus squalida Meyrick, 1926^{c g}
- Megacraspedus steineri Huemer & Karsholt, 2018
- Megacraspedus sumpichi Huemer & Karsholt, 2018
- Megacraspedus tabelli Huemer & Karsholt, 2018
- Megacraspedus tenuignathos Huemer & Karsholt, 2018
- Megacraspedus tenuiuncus Huemer & Karsholt, 2018
- Megacraspedus teriolensis Huemer & Karsholt, 2018
- Megacraspedus tokari Huemer & Karsholt, 2018
- Megacraspedus trineae Huemer & Karsholt, 2018
- Megacraspedus tristictus Walsingham, 1910^{c g}
- Megacraspedus uzunsyrtus Bidzilya & Budashkin, 2015^{g}
- Megacraspedus violacellum (Chrétien, 1915)^{c g}

Data sources: i = ITIS, c = Catalogue of Life, g = GBIF, b = Bugguide.net

== Questionable and former species ==
These Australian species are likely members of the genus group Pycnobathra Lower, 1901, and not part of Megacraspedus.

- Megacraspedus achroa Lower, 1901^{c g}
- Megacraspedus aenictodes Turner, 1919^{c g}
- Megacraspedus aphileta Meyrick, 1904^{c g}
- Megacraspedus argonota (Lower, 1901)
- Megacraspedus astemphella Meyrick, 1904^{c g}
- Megacraspedus centrosema Meyrick, 1904^{c g}
- Megacraspedus chalcoscia Meyrick, 1904^{c g}
- Megacraspedus coniodes Meyrick, 1904^{c g}
- Megacraspedus euxena Meyrick, 1904^{c g}
- Megacraspedus hoplitis Meyrick, 1904^{c g}
- Megacraspedus inficeta Meyrick, 1904^{c g}
- Megacraspedus ischnota Meyrick, 1904^{c g}
- Megacraspedus isotis Meyrick, 1904^{c g}
- Megacraspedus melitopis Meyrick, 1904^{c g}
- Megacraspedus niphodes (Lower, 1897)^{c g}
- Megacraspedus oxyphanes Meyrick, 1904^{c g}
- Megacraspedus pityritis Meyrick, 1904^{c g}
- Megacraspedus platyleuca Meyrick, 1904^{c g}
- Megacraspedus popularis Meyrick, 1904^{c g}
- Megacraspedus sagittifera (Lower, 1900)^{c g}
- Megacraspedus sclerotricha Meyrick, 1904^{c g}
- Megacraspedus sematacma Meyrick, 1921^{c g}
- Megacraspedus stratimera (Lower, 1897)^{c g}

In addition, these accepted species probably do not belong in Megacraspedus:

- Megacraspedus calamogonus Meyrick, 1886^{c g} - New Zealand
- Megacraspedus exilis Walsingham, 1909^{c g} - Mexico
- Megacraspedus plutella (Chambers, 1874)^{c g b} - North America

These species have been determined to be synonyms of other species:

- Megacraspedus arnaldi (Turati & Krüger, 1936) - synonym of M. violacellum (Chrétien, 1915)
- Megacraspedus culminicola Le Cerf, 1932 - synonym of M. homochroa Le Cerf, 1932
- Megacraspedus escalerellus Schmidt, 1941 - synonym of M. squalida Meyrick, 1926
- Megacraspedus grossisquammellus Chrétien, 1925 - synonym of M. lanceolellus (Zeller, 1850)
- Megacraspedus hessleriellus Rössler, 1866 - synonym of M. lanceolellus (Zeller, 1850)
- Megacraspedus incertellus Rebel, 1930 - synonym of M. dolosellus (Zeller, 1839)
- Megacraspedus kaszabianus Povolný, 1982 - synonym of M. leuca (Filipjev, 1929)
- Megacraspedus mareotidellus Turati, 1924 - synonym of M. numidellus (Chrétien, 1915)
- Megacraspedus neurophanes (Meyrick, 1926) - synonym of M. fallax (Mann, 1867)
- Megacraspedus separatellus (Fischer von Röslerstamm, 1843) - synonym of M. dolosellus (Zeller, 1839)
- Megacraspedus subdolellus Staudinger, 1859 - synonym of M. lanceolellus (Zeller, 1850)
- Megacraspedus tutti Walsingham, 1887 - synonym of M. lanceolellus (Zeller, 1850)

Data sources: i = ITIS, c = Catalogue of Life, g = GBIF, b = Bugguide.net
