= Megacraspedus albovenata =

Scientific classification
- Kingdom: Animalia
- Phylum: Arthropoda
- Clade: Pancrustacea
- Class: Insecta
- Order: Lepidoptera
- Family: Gelechiidae
- Genus: Megacraspedus
- Species: M. albovenata

Binomial name
- Megacraspedus albovenata Junnilainen, 2010

Species of moth

Megacraspedus albovenata is a moth of the family Gelechiidae. It is found in the southern Urals (the Orenburg area), the Czech Republic and Slovakia. The habitat consists of grassy steppe.
