= Gibberifera qingchengensis =

Scientific classification
- Domain: Eukaryota
- Kingdom: Animalia
- Phylum: Arthropoda
- Class: Insecta
- Order: Lepidoptera
- Family: Tortricidae
- Genus: Gibberifera
- Species: G. qingchengensis

Binomial name
- Gibberifera qingchengensis Nasu & Liu, 1996

Species of moth

Gibberifera qingchengensis is a species of moth of the family Tortricidae. It is found in China (Tianjin, Sichuan, Guizhou).

The wingspan is about 17 mm (0.67 in).
