= Megacraspedus bilineatella =

Scientific classification
- Kingdom: Animalia
- Phylum: Arthropoda
- Clade: Pancrustacea
- Class: Insecta
- Order: Lepidoptera
- Family: Gelechiidae
- Genus: Megacraspedus
- Species: M. bilineatella

Binomial name
- Megacraspedus bilineatella Huemer & Karsholt, 1996

Species of moth

Megacraspedus bilineatella is a moth of the family Gelechiidae. It was described by Peter Huemer and Ole Karsholt in 1996. It is found in Italy.
