= Megacraspedus lanceolellus =

Scientific classification
- Kingdom: Animalia
- Phylum: Arthropoda
- Clade: Pancrustacea
- Class: Insecta
- Order: Lepidoptera
- Family: Gelechiidae
- Genus: Megacraspedus
- Species: M. lanceolellus

Binomial name
- Megacraspedus lanceolellus (Zeller, 1850)

Synonyms
- Ypsolophus lanceolellus Zeller, 1850; Megacraspedus hessleriellus Rössler, 1866

Species of moth

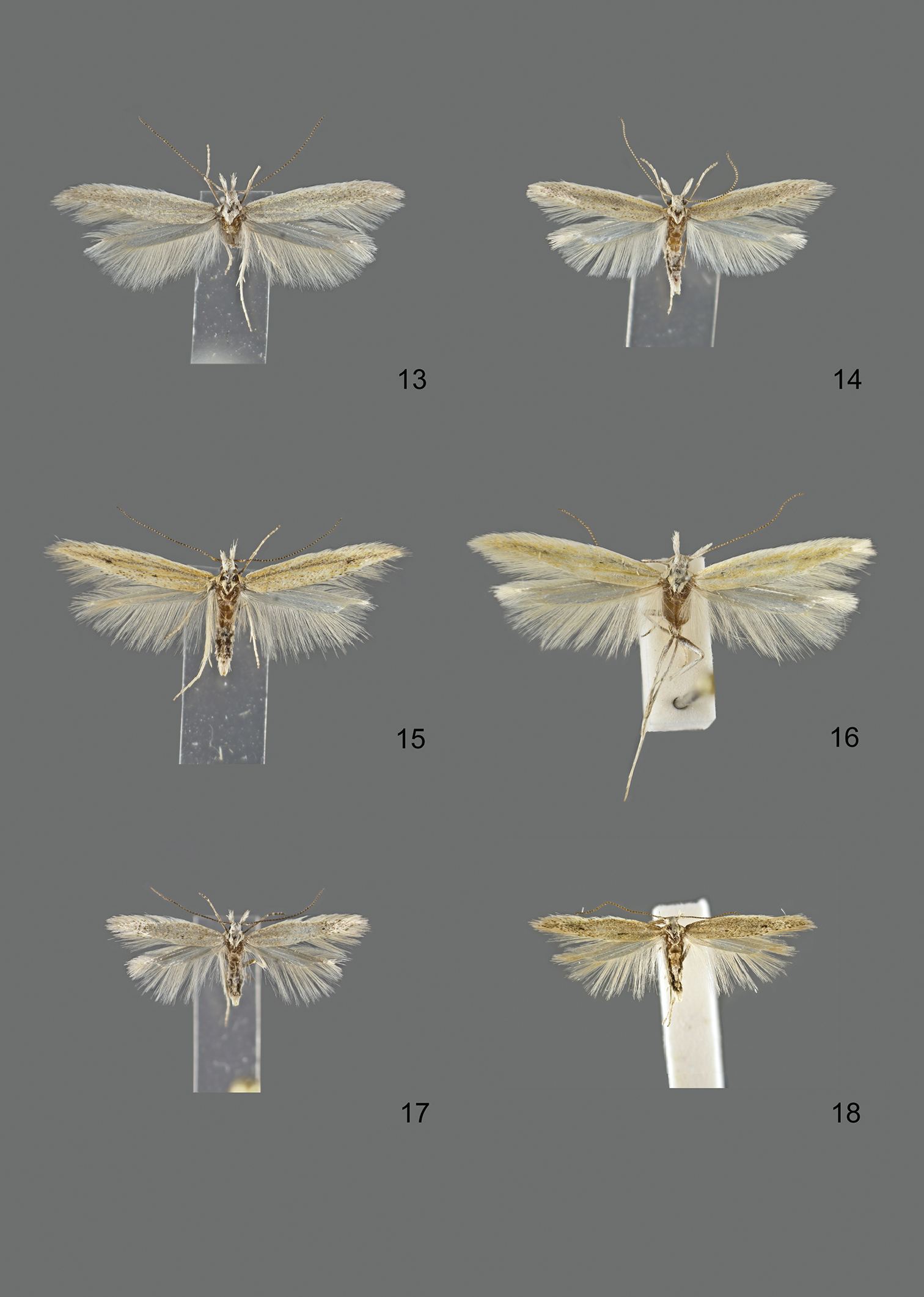
Megacraspedus adults in dorsal view

Megacraspedus lanceolellus is a moth of the family Gelechiidae. It was described by Philipp Christoph Zeller in 1850. It is found in Spain, France, Germany, Austria, Italy and Ukraine, as well as on Sicily.
