= Megacraspedus attritellus =

Scientific classification
- Kingdom: Animalia
- Phylum: Arthropoda
- Class: Insecta
- Order: Lepidoptera
- Family: Gelechiidae
- Genus: Megacraspedus
- Species: M. attritellus

Binomial name
- Megacraspedus attritellus Staudinger, 1871

Species of moth

Megacraspedus attritellus is a moth of the family Gelechiidae. It is found in Russia (Lower Volga, southern Ural) and possibly Turkey.

The wingspan is 10.5–12 mm (0.41–0.47 in). The ground colour of the forewings is white, the costal, dorsal and apical areas with brown-tipped scales. The hindwings are pale fuscous.
