= Megacraspedus plutella =

Scientific classification
- Kingdom: Animalia
- Phylum: Arthropoda
- Clade: Pancrustacea
- Class: Insecta
- Order: Lepidoptera
- Family: Gelechiidae
- Genus: Megacraspedus
- Species: M. plutella

Binomial name
- Megacraspedus plutella (Chambers, 1874)

Synonyms
- Neda plutella Chambers, 1874

Species of moth

Megacraspedus plutella is a moth of the family Gelechiidae. It was described by Vactor Tousey Chambers in 1874. It is found in North America, where it has been recorded from Arizona, New Mexico and Texas. It is the only member of the genus to be located north of Mexico.

The dorsal margin of the forewings are creamy white to a point beyond the beginning of the cilia, but otherwise dark gray brown, except that the extreme costa is creamy white and the costal margin is obscurely streaked with the same hue. It has a forewing length of 5 mm (0.20 in) and can elevate to 5,000 ft (1,500 m).
