= Megacraspedus mareotidellus =

Scientific classification
- Domain: Eukaryota
- Kingdom: Animalia
- Phylum: Arthropoda
- Class: Insecta
- Order: Lepidoptera
- Family: Gelechiidae
- Genus: Megacraspedus
- Species: M. mareotidellus

Binomial name
- Megacraspedus mareotidellus Turati, 1924

Species of moth

Megacraspedus mareotidellus is a moth of the family Gelechiidae. It was described by Turati in 1924. It is found in Libya.
