= Megacraspedus serica =

Scientific classification
- Kingdom: Animalia
- Phylum: Arthropoda
- Class: Insecta
- Order: Lepidoptera
- Family: Gelechiidae
- Genus: Megacraspedus
- Species: M. serica

Binomial name
- Megacraspedus serica Meyrick, 1909

Species of moth

Megacraspedus serica is a moth of the family Gelechiidae. It was described by Edward Meyrick in 1909. It is found in South Africa.

The wingspan is about 10 mm (0.39 in). The forewings are grey, suffusedly irrorated (sprinkled) with shining white, becoming wholly white towards the costa on the anterior half, greyest towards the apex. A few scattered black specks are found especially on the posterior half. The hindwings are whitish.

Although the species is generally accepted, the generic classification of Megacraspedus serica has been questioned.
