= Gibberifera clavata =

Scientific classification
- Kingdom: Animalia
- Phylum: Arthropoda
- Clade: Pancrustacea
- Class: Insecta
- Order: Lepidoptera
- Family: Tortricidae
- Genus: Gibberifera
- Species: G. clavata

Binomial name
- Gibberifera clavata Zhang & Li, 2004

Species of moth

Gibberifera clavata is a species of moth of the family Tortricidae. It is found in Tibet, China.

The wingspan is 15–17 mm.
