= Megacraspedus balneariellus =

Scientific classification
- Domain: Eukaryota
- Kingdom: Animalia
- Phylum: Arthropoda
- Class: Insecta
- Order: Lepidoptera
- Family: Gelechiidae
- Genus: Megacraspedus
- Species: M. balneariellus

Binomial name
- Megacraspedus balneariellus (Chrétien, 1907)

Synonyms
- Chilopselaphus balneariellus Chrétien, 1907; Chilopselaphus balneariellus podolicus Toll, 1942

Species of moth

Megacraspedus balneariellus is a moth of the family Gelechiidae. It is very locally distributed from central Europe to the Ural Mountains.

The wingspan is about 15 mm (0.59 in).

== Subspecies ==
- Megacraspedus balneariellus balneariellus
- Megacraspedus balneariellus podolicus (Toll, 1942)
