= Megacraspedus cuencellus =

Scientific classification
- Kingdom: Animalia
- Phylum: Arthropoda
- Class: Insecta
- Order: Lepidoptera
- Family: Gelechiidae
- Genus: Megacraspedus
- Species: M. cuencellus

Binomial name
- Megacraspedus cuencellus Caradja, 1920

Species of moth

Megacraspedus cuencellus is a moth of the family Gelechiidae. It was described by Aristide Caradja in 1920.

== Distribution ==
It is found in France and Spain.

== Description ==
The forewings are uniform mouse grey with the margin whitish from one-third to the apex. The hindwings are mouse grey.
