= Megacraspedus squalida =

Scientific classification
- Kingdom: Animalia
- Phylum: Arthropoda
- Class: Insecta
- Order: Lepidoptera
- Family: Gelechiidae
- Genus: Megacraspedus
- Species: M. squalida

Binomial name
- Megacraspedus squalida Meyrick, 1926

Species of moth

Megacraspedus squalida is a moth of the family Gelechiidae. It was described by Edward Meyrick in 1926. It is found in Spain.

The wingspan is about 18 mm (0.71 in). The forewings are whitish, irregularly sprinkled with fuscous and blackish, the veins forming obscurely defined white lines. The hindwings are whitish.

Megacraspedus squalida is a small twirler moth known primarily from Spain, distinguished by its small size and, most notably, the flightless nature of its females due to extreme wing reduction.

== Taxonomy and Discovery ==
- Scientific Name: Megacraspedus squalida Meyrick, 1926.
- Family: Gelechiidae (twirler moths).
- Type Locality: Sierra Nevada, Spain.

== Sexual Dimorphism and Brachyptery ==
The genus Megacraspedus is well-known for widespread Sexual dimorphism (differences in appearance between males and females), and this species is a good example.

- Male: Males have a normal wingspan, allowing them to fly. The male adult of a related species, for comparison, can have a wingspan of around 17-21 mm and is characterized by forewings that are often grey or lightly speckled with dots, and a second segment of the labial palpus with a characteristic brush of long scales.
- Female (Brachypterous): The females of M. squalida exhibit Brachyptery, which means their wings are significantly reduced (shorter than normal) and non-functional for flight.
  - A description of the female of M. squalida notes a small wingspan (around 9mm) and extremely reduced hindwings (about 1.4 mm long), making them essentially flightless. This wing reduction is common among the females of most species in the Megacraspedus genus, which is thought to be an adaptation to their high-altitude or arid habitats.

== Ecology and Habitat ==
- Distribution: It is a Palearctic species, and its known records point to the Iberian Peninsula, particularly the Sierra Nevada in Spain.
- Host Plants: The confirmed host plants for the entire genus Megacraspedus belong to the family Poaceae (grasses). While the specific host plant and early stages for M. squalida itself are often listed as unknown, it is highly likely to feed on grasses.
- Habitat: Moths in this genus are often found in mountainous or high-altitude areas. Related species have been collected at altitudes between 1300 and 1650m, suggesting it is a species of alpine or montane habitat.
