= Gibberifera glaciata =

Scientific classification
- Kingdom: Animalia
- Phylum: Arthropoda
- Class: Insecta
- Order: Lepidoptera
- Family: Tortricidae
- Genus: Gibberifera
- Species: G. glaciata

Binomial name
- Gibberifera glaciata (Meyrick, 1907)

Synonyms
- Cydia glaciata Meyrick, 1907

Species of moth

Gibberifera glaciata is a species of moth of the family Tortricidae. It is found in China (Henan, Hunan, Sichuan, Guizhou, Yunnan, Tibet), Taiwan, Thailand, India, Nepal and Pakistan.

The larvae feed on Salix species.
