= Megacraspedus sagittifera =

Scientific classification
- Domain: Eukaryota
- Kingdom: Animalia
- Phylum: Arthropoda
- Class: Insecta
- Order: Lepidoptera
- Family: Gelechiidae
- Genus: Megacraspedus
- Species: M. sagittifera

Binomial name
- Megacraspedus sagittifera (Lower, 1900)

Synonyms
- Paltodora sagittifera Lower, 1900

Species of moth

Megacraspedus sagittifera is a moth of the family Gelechiidae. It was described by Oswald Bertram Lower in 1900. It is found in Australia, where it has been recorded from New South Wales.

The wingspan is about 11 mm (0.43 in). The forewings are whitish ochreous, mixed with whitish and sprinkled with dark fuscous or blackish. The costal edge is slenderly white. The plical stigma is distinct, blackish and sometimes with the first discal obliquely beyond it. There is an elongate blackish dot below the usual position of the second discal stigma. The hindwings are pale grey or grey whitish.
