= Megacraspedus exilis =

Scientific classification
- Domain: Eukaryota
- Kingdom: Animalia
- Phylum: Arthropoda
- Class: Insecta
- Order: Lepidoptera
- Family: Gelechiidae
- Genus: Megacraspedus
- Species: M. exilis

Binomial name
- Megacraspedus exilis Walsingham, 1909

Species of moth

Megacraspedus exilis is a moth of the family Gelechiidae. It was described by Thomas de Grey, 6th Baron Walsingham, in 1909. It is found in Mexico (Guerrero) and the southern United States, where it has been recorded from Texas.

The wingspan is about 12 mm (0.47 in). The forewings are white, profusely irrorated with dark bronzy brown scaling, through which runs a longitudinal blackish median streak from the base to the apex, which, except for a slight step upward about the end of the cell, is very nearly straight throughout. The brown dusting is much condensed along its upper edge on the basal half, and there is a small detached blackish subcostal spot at one-third from the base. The costa is very narrowly, and the dorsum narrowly, pure white. The hindwings are shining, very pale bluish grey.
