= Megacraspedus numidellus =

Scientific classification
- Domain: Eukaryota
- Kingdom: Animalia
- Phylum: Arthropoda
- Class: Insecta
- Order: Lepidoptera
- Family: Gelechiidae
- Genus: Megacraspedus
- Species: M. numidellus

Binomial name
- Megacraspedus numidellus (Chrétien, 1915)

Synonyms
- Chilopselaphus numidellus Chrétien, 1915

Species of moth

Megacraspedus numidellus is a moth of the family Gelechiidae. It was described by Pierre Chrétien in 1915. It is found in Tunisia.
