= Megacraspedus escalerellus =

Scientific classification
- Domain: Eukaryota
- Kingdom: Animalia
- Phylum: Arthropoda
- Class: Insecta
- Order: Lepidoptera
- Family: Gelechiidae
- Genus: Megacraspedus
- Species: M. escalerellus

Binomial name
- Megacraspedus escalerellus Schmidt, 1941

Species of moth

Megacraspedus escalerellus is a moth of the family Gelechiidae. It was described by Schmidt in 1941. It is found in Spain.

The wingspan is about 20 mm (0.79 in).
