= Megacraspedus orenburgensis =

Scientific classification
- Kingdom: Animalia
- Phylum: Arthropoda
- Clade: Pancrustacea
- Class: Insecta
- Order: Lepidoptera
- Family: Gelechiidae
- Genus: Megacraspedus
- Species: M. orenburgensis

Binomial name
- Megacraspedus orenburgensis Junnilainen & Nupponen, 2010

Species of moth

Megacraspedus orenburgensis is a moth of the family Gelechiidae. It is found in Russia (the southern Ural). The habitat consists of chalk steppe.

The wingspan is 11.5–14.5 mm.
