= Megacraspedus niphorrhoa =

Scientific classification
- Domain: Eukaryota
- Kingdom: Animalia
- Phylum: Arthropoda
- Class: Insecta
- Order: Lepidoptera
- Family: Gelechiidae
- Genus: Megacraspedus
- Species: M. niphorrhoa

Binomial name
- Megacraspedus niphorrhoa (Meyrick, 1926)

Synonyms
- Trichembola niphorrhoa Meyrick, 1926

Species of insect

Megacraspedus niphorrhoa is a moth of the family Gelechiidae. It is found in Russia (southern Ural) and Kazakhstan (Uralsk).

The wingspan is 17–20 mm (0.67–0.79 in) for males and 16–17 mm (0.63–0.67 in) for females.
