= Megacraspedus macrocanellus =

Scientific classification
- Domain: Eukaryota
- Kingdom: Animalia
- Phylum: Arthropoda
- Class: Insecta
- Order: Lepidoptera
- Family: Gelechiidae
- Genus: Megacraspedus
- Species: M. macrocanellus

Binomial name
- Megacraspedus macrocanellus D. Lucas, 1932

Species of moth

Megacraspedus macrocanellus is a moth of the family Gelechiidae. It was described by Daniel Lucas in 1932. It is found in Morocco.
