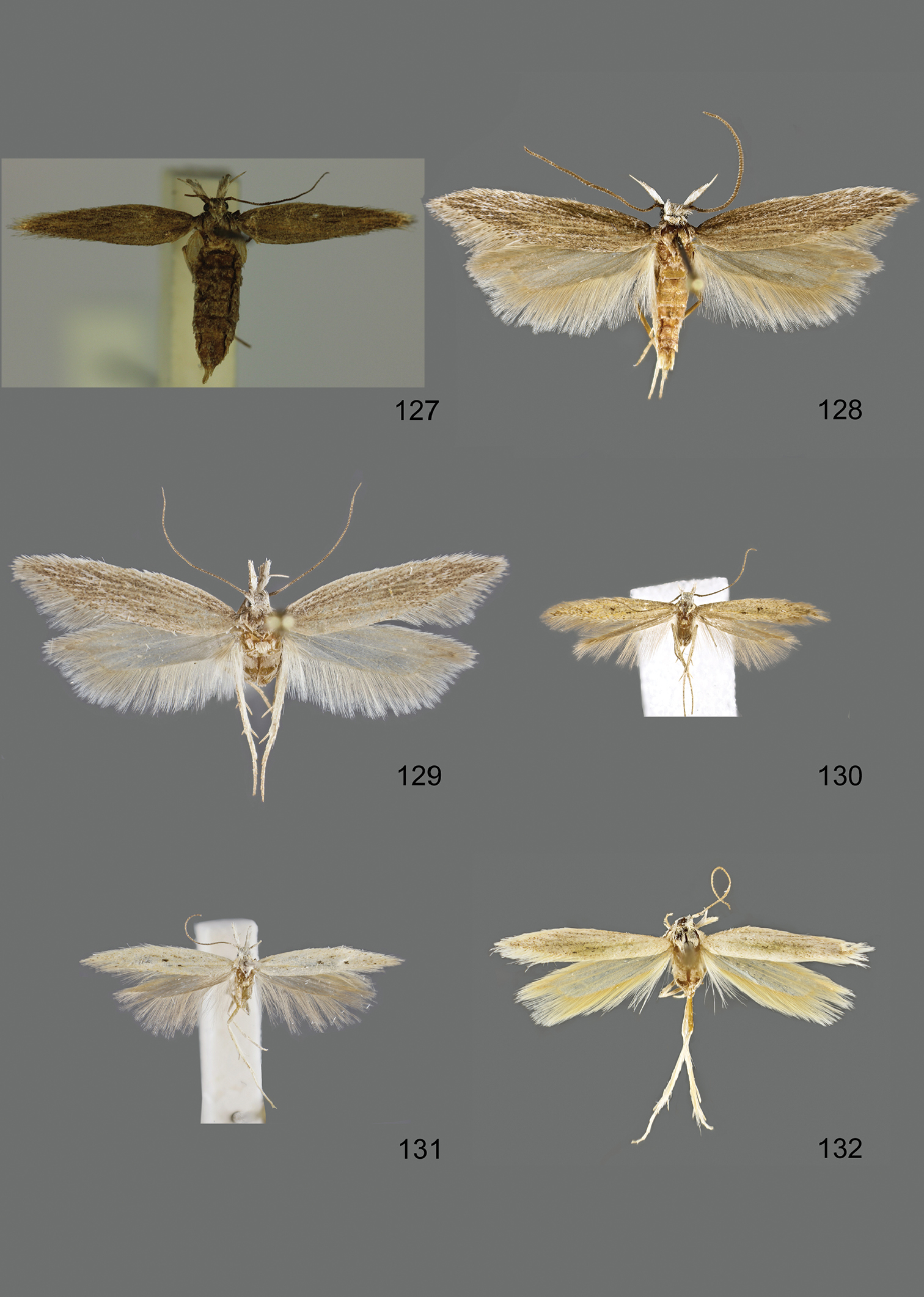

Scientific classification
- Domain: Eukaryota
- Kingdom: Animalia
- Phylum: Arthropoda
- Class: Insecta
- Order: Lepidoptera
- Family: Gelechiidae
- Genus: Megacraspedus
- Species: M. violacellum

Binomial name
- Megacraspedus violacellum (Chrétien, 1915)

Synonyms
- Toxoceras violacellum Chrétien, 1915; Cauloecista chretienella Dumont, 1928; Cauloecista halfella Dumont, 1928

= Megacraspedus violacellum =

Species of moth

Megacraspedus violacellum is a moth of the family Gelechiidae. It was described by Pierre Chrétien in 1915. It is found in North Africa, where it has been recorded from Algeria and Tunisia.
