= Megacraspedus dolosellus =

Scientific classification
- Kingdom: Animalia
- Phylum: Arthropoda
- Clade: Pancrustacea
- Class: Insecta
- Order: Lepidoptera
- Family: Gelechiidae
- Genus: Megacraspedus
- Species: M. dolosellus

Binomial name
- Megacraspedus dolosellus (Zeller, 1839)

Synonyms
- Ypsolophus (Megacraspedus) dolosellus Zeller, 1839

Species of moth

Megacraspedus dolosellus is a moth of the family Gelechiidae. It was described by Zeller in 1839. It is found in Spain, France, Austria, Italy, the Czech Republic, Slovakia, Albania, Bosnia and Herzegovina, Hungary, Romania, Bulgaria, North Macedonia, Ukraine and Russia.

The wingspan is 10–15 mm (0.39–0.59 in).
