= Gibberifera yadongensis =

Scientific classification
- Domain: Eukaryota
- Kingdom: Animalia
- Phylum: Arthropoda
- Class: Insecta
- Order: Lepidoptera
- Family: Tortricidae
- Genus: Gibberifera
- Species: G. yadongensis

Binomial name
- Gibberifera yadongensis Nasu & Liu, 1996

Species of moth

Gibberifera yadongensis is a species of moth of the family Tortricidae. It is found in China (Sichuan, Tibet).
