= Megacraspedus albella =

Scientific classification
- Domain: Eukaryota
- Kingdom: Animalia
- Phylum: Arthropoda
- Class: Insecta
- Order: Lepidoptera
- Family: Gelechiidae
- Genus: Megacraspedus
- Species: M. albella

Binomial name
- Megacraspedus albella (Amsel, 1935)

Synonyms
- Chilopselaphus albella Amsel, 1935

Species of moth

Megacraspedus albella is a moth of the family Gelechiidae. It was described by Hans Georg Amsel in 1935 and is found in Palestine.
