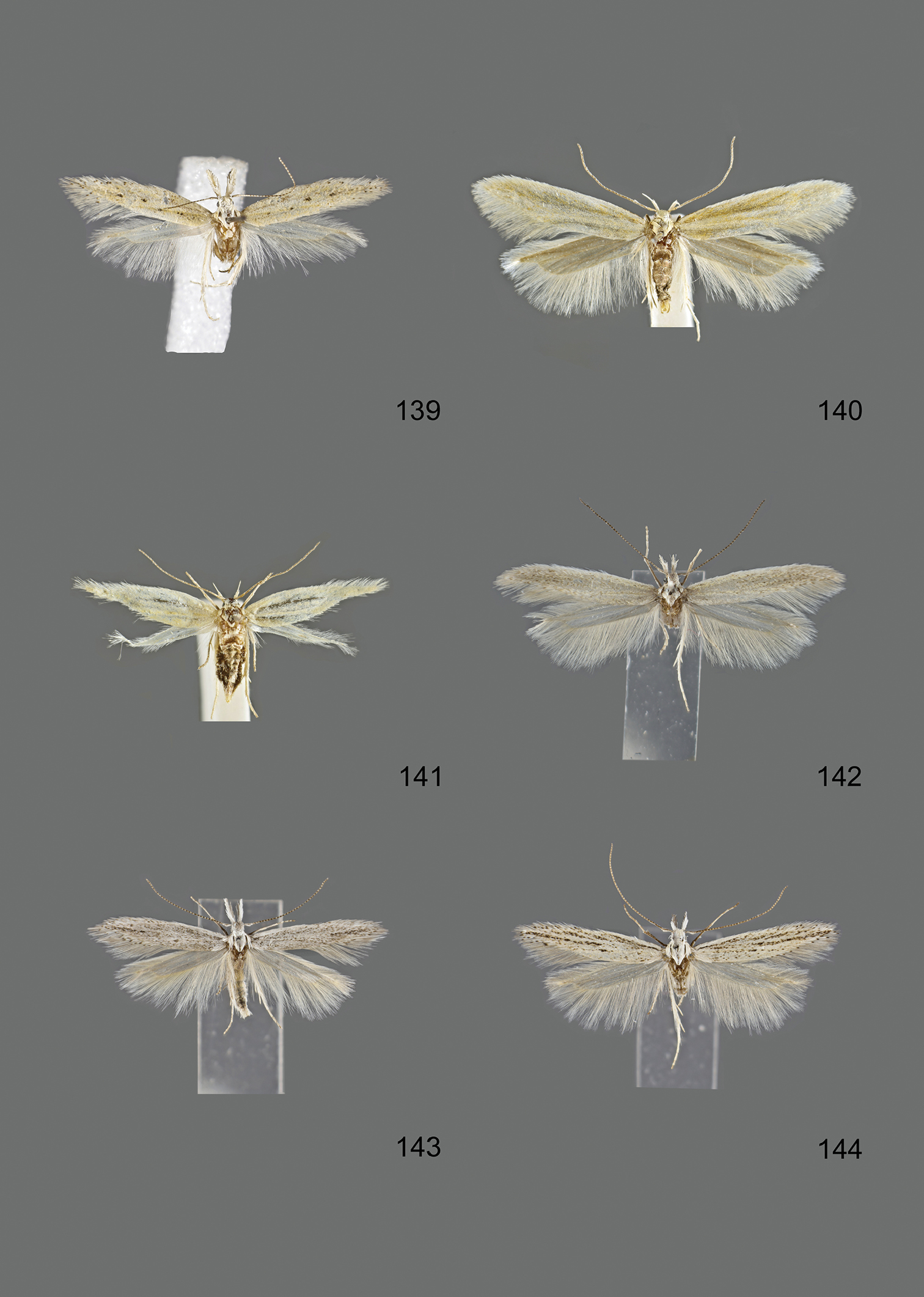
- Specimens of Megacraspedus sp.

Scientific classification
- Kingdom: Animalia
- Phylum: Arthropoda
- Clade: Pancrustacea
- Class: Insecta
- Order: Lepidoptera
- Family: Gelechiidae
- Genus: Megacraspedus
- Species: M. eburnellus

Binomial name
- Megacraspedus eburnellus Huemer & Karsholt, 2001

= Megacraspedus eburnellus =

Species of moth

Megacraspedus eburnellus is a moth of the family Gelechiidae. It was described by Peter Huemer and Ole Karsholt in 2001. It is found in Italy.
