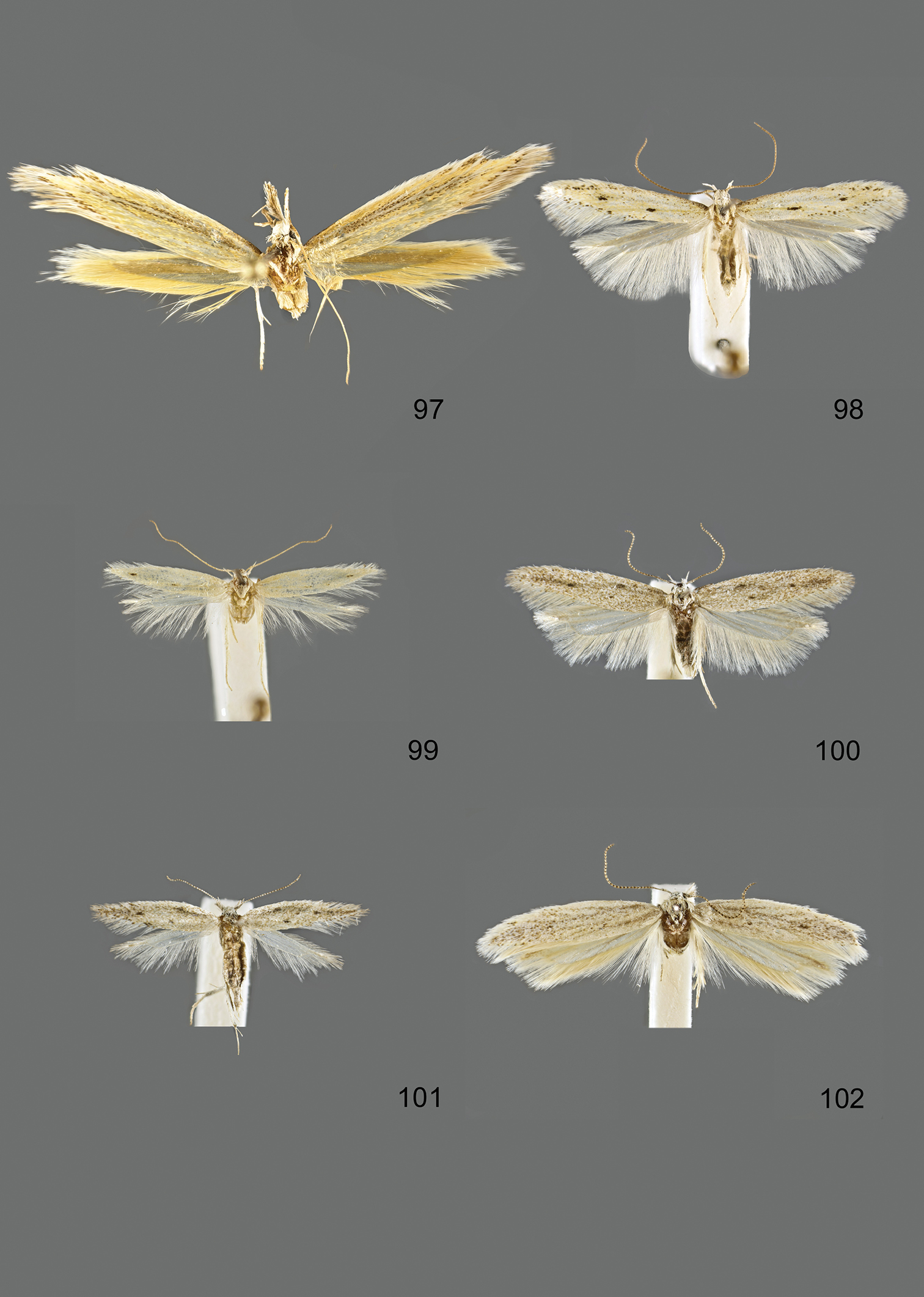
- Megacraspedus imparellus adults in dorsal view

Scientific classification
- Domain: Eukaryota
- Kingdom: Animalia
- Phylum: Arthropoda
- Class: Insecta
- Order: Lepidoptera
- Family: Gelechiidae
- Genus: Megacraspedus
- Species: M. imparellus

Binomial name
- Megacraspedus imparellus (Fischer von Röslerstamm, 1843)

Synonyms
- Ypsolophus imparellus Fischer von Röslerstamm, 1843

= Megacraspedus imparellus =

Species of moth

Megacraspedus imparellus is a moth of the family Gelechiidae. It was described by Fischer von Röslerstamm in 1843. It is found in Asia Minor, Russia (Uralsk), Andorra, Austria, Italy, the Czech Republic, Slovakia, Hungary and Romania.

The wingspan is about 15 mm (0.59 in).
