= Megacraspedus astemphella =

Scientific classification
- Kingdom: Animalia
- Phylum: Arthropoda
- Class: Insecta
- Order: Lepidoptera
- Family: Gelechiidae
- Genus: Megacraspedus
- Species: M. astemphella

Binomial name
- Megacraspedus astemphella Meyrick, 1904

Species of moth

Megacraspedus astemphella is a moth of the family Gelechiidae. It was described by Edward Meyrick in 1904. It is found in Australia, where it has been recorded from Western Australia and South Australia.

The wingspan is 9–11 mm (0.35–0.43 in). The forewings are fuscous, irrorated (sprinkled) with blackish fuscous and with a broad shining white costal streak from the base to the middle, then leaving the costa and narrowed to three-fourths. The stigmata are blackish fuscous, irregular and sometimes dash like, the plical very obliquely beyond the first discal. There are usually some undefined spots of whitish suffusion towards the costa posteriorly and at the termen. The hindwings are grey.
