= Megacraspedus sematacma =

Scientific classification
- Kingdom: Animalia
- Phylum: Arthropoda
- Class: Insecta
- Order: Lepidoptera
- Family: Gelechiidae
- Genus: Megacraspedus
- Species: M. sematacma

Binomial name
- Megacraspedus sematacma Meyrick, 1921

Species of moth

Megacraspedus sematacma is a moth of the family Gelechiidae. It was described by Edward Meyrick in 1921. It is found in Australia, where it has been recorded from Queensland.

The wingspan is 13–14 mm (0.51–0.55 in). The forewings are pale brownish ochreous, more or less sprinkled irregularly with dark fuscous scales and the costa suffused with whitish from the base to beyond the middle. The stigmata are black, with the plical obliquely beyond the first discal and with a faint pale acutely-angulated subterminal line. There is an elongate slightly curved black apical mark on the costa, one or two black dots before it, and two or three on the termen. The hindwings are rather light grey.
