= Megacraspedus popularis =

Scientific classification
- Kingdom: Animalia
- Phylum: Arthropoda
- Class: Insecta
- Order: Lepidoptera
- Family: Gelechiidae
- Genus: Megacraspedus
- Species: M. popularis

Binomial name
- Megacraspedus popularis Meyrick, 1904

Species of moth

Megacraspedus popularis is a moth of the family Gelechiidae. It was described by Edward Meyrick in 1904. It is found in Australia, where it has been recorded from New South Wales and Tasmania.

The wingspan is 11–13 mm (0.43–0.51 in). The forewings are rather dark fuscous, slightly purplish tinged, sprinkled with blackish, and with a few pale scales. The stigmata form round ferruginous-ochreous blackish-edged spots, sometimes very indistinct, with the plical touching the first discal and hardly beyond it. The plical and second discal stigmata are dark fuscous. The hindwings are grey.
