= Megacraspedus aphileta =

Scientific classification
- Kingdom: Animalia
- Phylum: Arthropoda
- Class: Insecta
- Order: Lepidoptera
- Family: Gelechiidae
- Genus: Megacraspedus
- Species: M. aphileta

Binomial name
- Megacraspedus aphileta Meyrick, 1904

Species of moth

Megacraspedus aphileta is a moth of the family Gelechiidae. It was described by Edward Meyrick in 1904. It is found in Australia, where it has been recorded from South Australia and Western Australia.

The wingspan is 10–13 mm (0.39–0.51 in). The forewings are light fuscous, somewhat mixed with whitish, with scattered black scales. The stigmata are dark fuscous or blackish, sometimes rather large, the plical very obliquely beyond the first discal. The hindwings are light grey.
