= Megacraspedus centrosema =

Scientific classification
- Kingdom: Animalia
- Phylum: Arthropoda
- Class: Insecta
- Order: Lepidoptera
- Family: Gelechiidae
- Genus: Megacraspedus
- Species: M. centrosema

Binomial name
- Megacraspedus centrosema Meyrick, 1904

Species of moth

Megacraspedus centrosema is a moth of the family Gelechiidae. It was described by Edward Meyrick in 1904. It is found in Australia, where it has been recorded from New South Wales and South Australia.

The wingspan is 11–12 mm (0.43–0.47 in). The forewings are fuscous with a shining white costal streak from the base to the apex, narrowed towards the extremities, the lower edge is straight and edged with dark fuscous. There is an undefined rather broad streak of white suffusion along the dorsum and termen. The hindwings are whitish grey.
