= Megacraspedus euxena =

Scientific classification
- Kingdom: Animalia
- Phylum: Arthropoda
- Class: Insecta
- Order: Lepidoptera
- Family: Gelechiidae
- Genus: Megacraspedus
- Species: M. euxena

Binomial name
- Megacraspedus euxena Meyrick, 1904

Species of moth

Megacraspedus euxena is a moth of the family Gelechiidae. It was described by Edward Meyrick in 1904. It is found in Australia, where it has been recorded from Western Australia.

The wingspan is 13–16 mm (0.51–0.63 in). The forewings are golden yellow ochreous with the costa narrowly white from the base to two-thirds. The stigmata are black, with the plical very obliquely beyond the first discal. The hindwings are grey.
