= Megacraspedus inficeta =

Scientific classification
- Kingdom: Animalia
- Phylum: Arthropoda
- Class: Insecta
- Order: Lepidoptera
- Family: Gelechiidae
- Genus: Megacraspedus
- Species: M. inficeta

Binomial name
- Megacraspedus inficeta Meyrick, 1904

Species of moth

Megacraspedus inficeta is a moth of the family Gelechiidae. It was described by Edward Meyrick in 1904. It is found in Australia, where it has been recorded from New South Wales and Tasmania.

The wingspan is 14–15 mm (0.55–0.59 in). The forewings are pale shining greyish bronzy ochreous with the costa narrowly suffused with white from the base to two-thirds. The first and second discal stigmata are small and black. The hindwings are light grey.
