= Dueville =

- Comune
- Comune di Dueville
- Location within Italy Location within Veneto
- Coordinates: 45°38′N 11°33′E
- Country: Italy
- Region: Veneto
- Province: Vicenza (VI)
- Frazioni: Passo di Riva, Povolaro, Vivaro

Area
  - Total: 20 km^{2} (7.7 sq mi)
- Elevation: 57 m (187 ft)

Population (28 February 2007)
  - Total: 13,735
  - Density: 690/km^{2} (1,800/sq mi)
- Demonym: Duevillesi
- Time zone: UTC+1 (CET)
  - Summer (DST): UTC+2 (CEST)
- Postal code: 36031
- Dialing code: 0444
- ISTAT code: 024038
- Patron saint: Santa Maria
- Saint day: 26 July
- Website: Official website

Dueville (Venetian: Doviłe) is a town and comune in the province of Vicenza, Veneto, Italy. It is south of SP50. As of 2007 Dueville had an estimated population of 13,988.

== Twin towns – sister cities ==
Dueville is twinned with:

- Calatayud, Spain (1989)
- Schorndorf, Germany (1998)
- Tulle, France (2008)

== Sources ==
- (Google Maps)
