= Megacraspedus ischnota =

Scientific classification
- Kingdom: Animalia
- Phylum: Arthropoda
- Class: Insecta
- Order: Lepidoptera
- Family: Gelechiidae
- Genus: Megacraspedus
- Species: M. ischnota

Binomial name
- Megacraspedus ischnota Meyrick, 1904

Species of moth

Megacraspedus ischnota is a moth of the family Gelechiidae. It was described by Edward Meyrick in 1904. It is found in Australia, where it has been recorded from Western Australia.

The wingspan is 7–9 mm (0.28–0.35 in). The forewings are pale ochreous, more or less wholly suffused with fuscous and sprinkled with dark fuscous and with an elongate dark fuscous dot on the fold at one-fourth. The plical and second discal stigmata are dark fuscous. The hindwings are whitish grey.
