= Megacraspedus isotis =

Scientific classification
- Kingdom: Animalia
- Phylum: Arthropoda
- Class: Insecta
- Order: Lepidoptera
- Family: Gelechiidae
- Genus: Megacraspedus
- Species: M. isotis

Binomial name
- Megacraspedus isotis Meyrick, 1904

Species of moth

Megacraspedus isotis is a moth of the family Gelechiidae. It was described by Edward Meyrick in 1904. It is found in Australia, where it has been recorded from Western Australia.

The wingspan is about 12 mm (0.47 in). The forewings are grey, sprinkled with whitish. The hindwings are grey.
