= Megacraspedus aenictodes =

Scientific classification
- Domain: Eukaryota
- Kingdom: Animalia
- Phylum: Arthropoda
- Class: Insecta
- Order: Lepidoptera
- Family: Gelechiidae
- Genus: Megacraspedus
- Species: M. aenictodes

Binomial name
- Megacraspedus aenictodes Turner, 1919

Species of moth

Megacraspedus aenictodes is a moth of the family Gelechiidae. It was described by Alfred Jefferis Turner in 1919. It is found in Australia, where it has been recorded from Queensland.

The wingspan is 11–12 mm (0.43–0.47 in). The forewings are fuscous with a rather narrow whitish costal streak from near the base to three-fifths. The hindwings are grey.
