= Megacraspedus oxyphanes =

Scientific classification
- Kingdom: Animalia
- Phylum: Arthropoda
- Class: Insecta
- Order: Lepidoptera
- Family: Gelechiidae
- Genus: Megacraspedus
- Species: M. oxyphanes

Binomial name
- Megacraspedus oxyphanes Meyrick, 1904

Species of moth

Megacraspedus oxyphanes is a moth of the family Gelechiidae. It was described by Edward Meyrick in 1904. It is found in Australia, where it has been recorded from Western Australia.

The wingspan is about 12 mm (0.47 in). The forewings are fuscous with a rather broad shining white costal streak from the base to five-sixths, narrowed to the extremities, edged below with slight dark fuscous suffusion and with an undefined rather broad streak of white suffusion along the dorsum and lower half of the termen. The plical stigma is indistinct, darker fuscous. The hindwings are light grey.
