= Megacraspedus coniodes =

Scientific classification
- Kingdom: Animalia
- Phylum: Arthropoda
- Class: Insecta
- Order: Lepidoptera
- Family: Gelechiidae
- Genus: Megacraspedus
- Species: M. coniodes

Binomial name
- Megacraspedus coniodes Meyrick, 1904

Species of moth

Megacraspedus coniodes is a moth of the family Gelechiidae. It was described by Edward Meyrick in 1904. It is found in Australia, where it has been recorded from South Australia.

The wingspan is 10–11 mm (0.39–0.43 in). The forewings are light greyish ochreous, sprinkled with dark fuscous. The stigmata are blackish, with the plical obliquely beyond the first discal. The hindwings are light grey.
