= Megacraspedus sclerotricha =

Scientific classification
- Kingdom: Animalia
- Phylum: Arthropoda
- Class: Insecta
- Order: Lepidoptera
- Family: Gelechiidae
- Genus: Megacraspedus
- Species: M. sclerotricha

Binomial name
- Megacraspedus sclerotricha Meyrick, 1904

Species of moth

Megacraspedus sclerotricha is a moth of the family Gelechiidae. It was described by Edward Meyrick in 1904. It is found in Australia, where it has been recorded from New South Wales.

The wingspan is 12–15 mm (0.47–0.59 in). The forewings are light fuscous mixed with whitish, sometimes ochreous tinged and with a moderate rather undefined white costal streak from the base to four-fifths, narrowed posteriorly. The plical and second discal stigmata are dark fuscous, sometimes indistinct. The hindwings are grey or light grey.
