= Pycnobathra achroa =

Scientific classification
- Domain: Eukaryota
- Kingdom: Animalia
- Phylum: Arthropoda
- Class: Insecta
- Order: Lepidoptera
- Family: Gelechiidae
- Genus: Pycnobathra
- Species: P. achroa

Binomial name
- Pycnobathra achroa Lower, 1901

Synonyms
- Megacraspedus achroa

Species of moth

Pycnobathra achroa is a moth of the family Gelechiidae. It was described by Oswald Bertram Lower in 1901. It is found in Australia, where it has been recorded from New South Wales.

The wingspan is about 14 mm (0.55 in). The forewings are whitish ochreous, rather densely irrorated (sprinkled) with fuscous. The stigmata are rather darker fuscous, indistinct, the plical obliquely beyond the first discal. The hindwings are light grey.
