= Megacraspedus hoplitis =

Scientific classification
- Kingdom: Animalia
- Phylum: Arthropoda
- Class: Insecta
- Order: Lepidoptera
- Family: Gelechiidae
- Genus: Megacraspedus
- Species: M. hoplitis

Binomial name
- Megacraspedus hoplitis Meyrick, 1904

Species of moth

Megacraspedus hoplitis is a moth of the family Gelechiidae. It was described by Edward Meyrick in 1904. It is found in Australia, where it has been recorded from Western Australia.

The wingspan is 14–15 mm (0.55–0.59 in). The forewings are bronzy greyish ochreous with the costa narrowly white from the base to two-thirds. The hindwings are grey.
