= Megacraspedus melitopis =

Scientific classification
- Kingdom: Animalia
- Phylum: Arthropoda
- Class: Insecta
- Order: Lepidoptera
- Family: Gelechiidae
- Genus: Megacraspedus
- Species: M. melitopis

Binomial name
- Megacraspedus melitopis Meyrick, 1904

Species of moth

Megacraspedus melitopis is a moth of the family Gelechiidae. It was described by Edward Meyrick in 1904. It is found in Australia, where it has been recorded from Western Australia.

The wingspan is about 16 mm (0.63 in). The forewings are golden bronzy ochreous with the costal edge shining white from near the base to two-thirds. The second discal stigma is minute and dark fuscous. The hindwings are grey.
