= Megacraspedus niphodes =

Scientific classification
- Domain: Eukaryota
- Kingdom: Animalia
- Phylum: Arthropoda
- Class: Insecta
- Order: Lepidoptera
- Family: Gelechiidae
- Genus: Megacraspedus
- Species: M. niphodes

Binomial name
- Megacraspedus niphodes (Lower, 1897)

Synonyms
- Eutorna niphodes Lower, 1897

Species of moth

Megacraspedus niphodes is a moth of the family Gelechiidae. It was described by Oswald Bertram Lower in 1897. It is found in Australia, where it has been recorded from Victoria and Tasmania.

The wingspan is 12–13 mm (0.47–0.51 in). The forewings are pale whitish ochreous. The stigmata are conspicuous and black, with the plical very obliquely beyond the first discal. The hindwings are light grey.
