= Megacraspedus arnaldi =

Scientific classification
- Kingdom: Animalia
- Phylum: Arthropoda
- Class: Insecta
- Order: Lepidoptera
- Family: Gelechiidae
- Genus: Megacraspedus
- Species: M. arnaldi

Binomial name
- Megacraspedus arnaldi (Turati & Krüger, 1930)

Synonyms
- Mesophleps arnaldi Turati & Krüger, 1936

Species of moth

Megacraspedus arnaldi is a moth of the family Gelechiidae. It is found in Libya.
