= Megacraspedus platyleuca =

Scientific classification
- Kingdom: Animalia
- Phylum: Arthropoda
- Class: Insecta
- Order: Lepidoptera
- Family: Gelechiidae
- Genus: Megacraspedus
- Species: M. platyleuca

Binomial name
- Megacraspedus platyleuca Meyrick, 1904

Species of moth

Megacraspedus platyleuca is a moth of the family Gelechiidae. It was described by Edward Meyrick in 1904. It is found in Australia, where it has been recorded from New South Wales, Victoria, Tasmania and Western Australia.

The wingspan is 11–12 mm (0.43–0.47 in). The forewings are fuscous, mixed with blackish fuscous and with a broad shining white costal streak from the base to beyond the middle, then leaving the costa and rather narrowed to four-fifths, an oblique white line from three-fourths of the costa, terminating immediately beyond the apex of this. A broad suffused white dorsal streak is found from the base to the tornus. The stigmata are black, the plical very obliquely beyond the first discal and there is some white suffusion towards the termen. The hindwings are light grey.
