= Megacraspedus pityritis =

Scientific classification
- Kingdom: Animalia
- Phylum: Arthropoda
- Class: Insecta
- Order: Lepidoptera
- Family: Gelechiidae
- Genus: Megacraspedus
- Species: M. pityritis

Binomial name
- Megacraspedus pityritis Meyrick, 1904

Species of moth

Megacraspedus pityritis is a moth of the family Gelechiidae. It was described by Edward Meyrick in 1904. It is found in Australia, where it has been recorded from southern Queensland, New South Wales, Victoria and Tasmania.

The wingspan is 9–12 mm (0.35–0.47 in). The forewings are pale whitish ochreous, more or less sprinkled with ochreous or fuscous, especially towards the apex. The stigmata are conspicuous and black, with the plical very obliquely beyond the first discal. The hindwings are ochreous grey whitish.
