= Megacraspedus stratimera =

Scientific classification
- Domain: Eukaryota
- Kingdom: Animalia
- Phylum: Arthropoda
- Class: Insecta
- Order: Lepidoptera
- Family: Gelechiidae
- Genus: Megacraspedus
- Species: M. stratimera

Binomial name
- Megacraspedus stratimera (Lower, 1897)

Synonyms
- Eutorna stratimera Lower, 1897

Species of moth

Megacraspedus stratimera is a moth of the family Gelechiidae. It was described by Oswald Bertram Lower in 1897. It is found in Australia, where it has been recorded from South Australia.

The wingspan is about 14 mm (0.55 in). The forewings are grey mixed with dark fuscous and posteriorly with whitish and with a white costal streak from the base to the middle, attenuated to the extremities. The plical and second discal stigmata are blackish and obscure. The hindwings are grey.
