= Girolamo Arnaldi =

Italian historian (1929–2016)

- Born: 31 January 1929; Pisa, Italy
- Died: 30 January 2016 (aged 86); Rome, Italy
- Occupation: Historian

Girolamo Arnaldi (31 January 1929 – 30 January 2016) was an Italian historian.

Born in Pisa, in 1951 Arnaldi graduated in Medieval History at the University of Naples, and then completed his postgraduate studied at the Italian Institute for Historical Studies in the same city. He was professor of Medieval History at the University of Bologna from 1964 to 1970 and at the Sapienza University of Rome from 1970 to 1999. Between 1966 and 1970 he was president of the Italian Historical Institute for the Middle Ages (ISIME) in Rome.

Arnaldi was the author of several historical essays, and his researches mainly focused on the role of Italy and of the papacy in shaping the medieval civilization. He also directed several collective works such as the Encyclopaedia of the Popes and the Enciclopedia Fridericiana for Treccani. He collaborated with RAI for the documentary series La straordinaria storia dell’Italia. His last book was L’Italia e i suoi invasori (2002), which in 2005 was translated in English and published by Harvard University Press with the title Italy and Its Invaders.

== Honour ==
- Italy: Knight Grand Cross of the Order of Merit of the Italian Republic (27 december 1993)
