= Megacraspedus chalcoscia =

Scientific classification
- Kingdom: Animalia
- Phylum: Arthropoda
- Class: Insecta
- Order: Lepidoptera
- Family: Gelechiidae
- Genus: Megacraspedus
- Species: M. chalcoscia

Binomial name
- Megacraspedus chalcoscia Meyrick, 1904

Species of moth

Megacraspedus chalcoscia is a species of moth of the family Gelechiidae. It was described by Edward Meyrick in 1904. It is found in Australia, where it has been recorded from South Australia and Western Australia.

The wingspan is 12–13 mm (0.47–0.51 in). The forewings are shining bronze with a slender white costal streak from the base to two-thirds. The stigmata are indistinct, dark fuscous, with the plical very obliquely beyond the first discal. The hindwings are grey.
