= Josef Emanuel Fischer von Röslerstamm =

Austrian entomologist (1787-1866)

Josef Emanuel Fischer von Röslerstamm or Josef Fischer von Röslerstamm or Josef Fischer von Rösslerstamm (19 February 1787, Rumburg – 17 March 1866, Vienna) was an Austrian entomologist who specialised in Lepidoptera. He was an industrialist manufacturing macaroni, vermicelli, and other processed foods. He lived in Vienna from 1837. Röslerstamm developed a method system of systematic tables (1834–1842) for the Microlepidoptera and described many new species of these tiny moths. He studied often in the Naturhistorisches Museum with Alois Friedrich Rogenhofer and Josef Johann Mann.

== Bibliography ==
- Fischer von Röslerstamm, J. E.: 1838, Abbildungen zur Berichtigung und Ergänzung der Schmetterlingskunde, besonders der Microlepidopterologie als Supplement zu Treitschke's und Hübner's europaeischen Schmetterlingen, mit erläuterndem Text. Leipzig, 15: 1–304.

== Further information and sources ==
- Mann, J.: 1866, Verh. zool. – bot. Ges. Wien, 16: Sitz. ber. 51–54.
- Horn, W. & Schenkling, S.: 1928, Index Litteraturae Entomologicae. Ser. I. Die Welt Literatur über die gesamte Entomologie bis inklusive 1863. Bd. II., Berlin: W. Horn, 360.
- Santifaller, L. & Obermayer – Marnach, E.: 1957, Fischer–Röslerstamm Josef Emanuel von. In: Österreichisches Biograpfisches Lexikon: 1815–1950, I. Band (A – Glä), Graz – Köln, 324.
- Koleška, Z.: 1980, Zprávy Čs. spol. ent. při ČSAV, Praha, 16: 49–50.
- Petersen, G.: 1984, Abh. Ber. Naturkundemus. Görlitz, 58(2): 49–60 + portrait.
- Gaedike, R. & Groll, E. K. eds. 2001, Entomologen der Welt (Biografien, Sammlungsverbleib). Datenbank, DEI Eberswalde im ZALF e. V.: "Fischer von Röslerstamm Jozef Emanuel".
