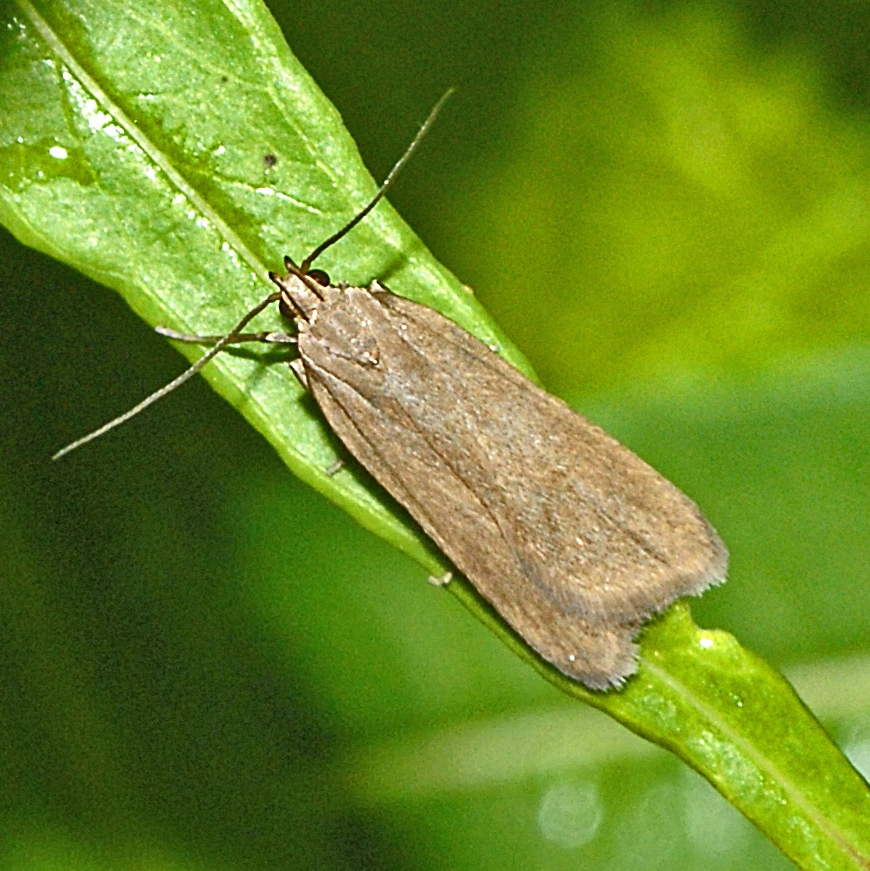
- Acompsia cinerella

Scientific classification
- Kingdom: Animalia
- Phylum: Arthropoda
- Clade: Pancrustacea
- Class: Insecta
- Order: Lepidoptera
- Family: Gelechiidae
- Subfamily: Dichomeridinae
- Genus: Acompsia; Hübner, 1825

Type species
- Phalaena cinerella Clerck, 1759

Species
- Many, see text

Synonyms
- See text

= Acompsia =

Genus of moths

Acompsia is a genus of the twirler moth family (Gelechiidae). Though it has once been assigned to the proposed subfamily "Anacampsinae" (here included in Gelechiinae), it is generally placed in the Dichomeridinae. Some authors include Telephila here as a subgenus, while others prefer to keep it distinct as its relationships are fairly obscure.

== Species ==
Species of Acompsia are:

- Subgenus Acompsia Hübner, 1825
  - Acompsia antirrhinella (Millière, 1866)
  - Acompsia bidzilyai Huemer & Karsholt, 2002
  - Acompsia caucasella Huemer & Karsholt, 2002
  - Acompsia cinerella (Clerck, 1759)
  - Acompsia delmastroella Huemer, 1998
  - Acompsia dimorpha Petry, 1904
  - Acompsia fibigeri Huemer & Karsholt, 2002
  - Acompsia maculosella (Stainton, 1851)
  - Acompsia minorella (Rebel, 1899)
  - Acompsia muellerrutzi Wehrli, 1925
  - Acompsia ponomarenkoae Huemer & Karsholt, 2002
  - Acompsia pyrenaella Huemer & Karsholt, 2002
  - Acompsia schepleri Huemer & Karsholt, 2002
  - Acompsia schmidtiellus (Heyden, 1848)
  - Acompsia subpunctella Svensson, 1966
  - Acompsia syriella Huemer & Karsholt, 2002
  - Acompsia tripunctella (Denis & Schiffermüller, 1775)
- Subgenus Telephila Meyrick, 1923
- Unknown status
  - Acompsia tenebrosella

== Former species ==
- Acompsia angulifera (Walsingham, 1897) (now in Cathegesis)
- Acompsia jordanella (Rebel, 1911) (now in Oxypteryx)
- Acompsia psoricopterella (Walsingham, 1892) (now in Cathegesis)
- Acompsia vinitincta (Walsingham, 1910) (now in Cathegesis)

== Synonyms ==
Invalid scientific names (junior synonyms and others) of Brachmia are:

- Acampsia (lapsus)
- Accompsia Bruand, 1850 (unjustified emendation)
- Brachicrossata (lapsus)
- Brachycrossata Heinemann, 1870
