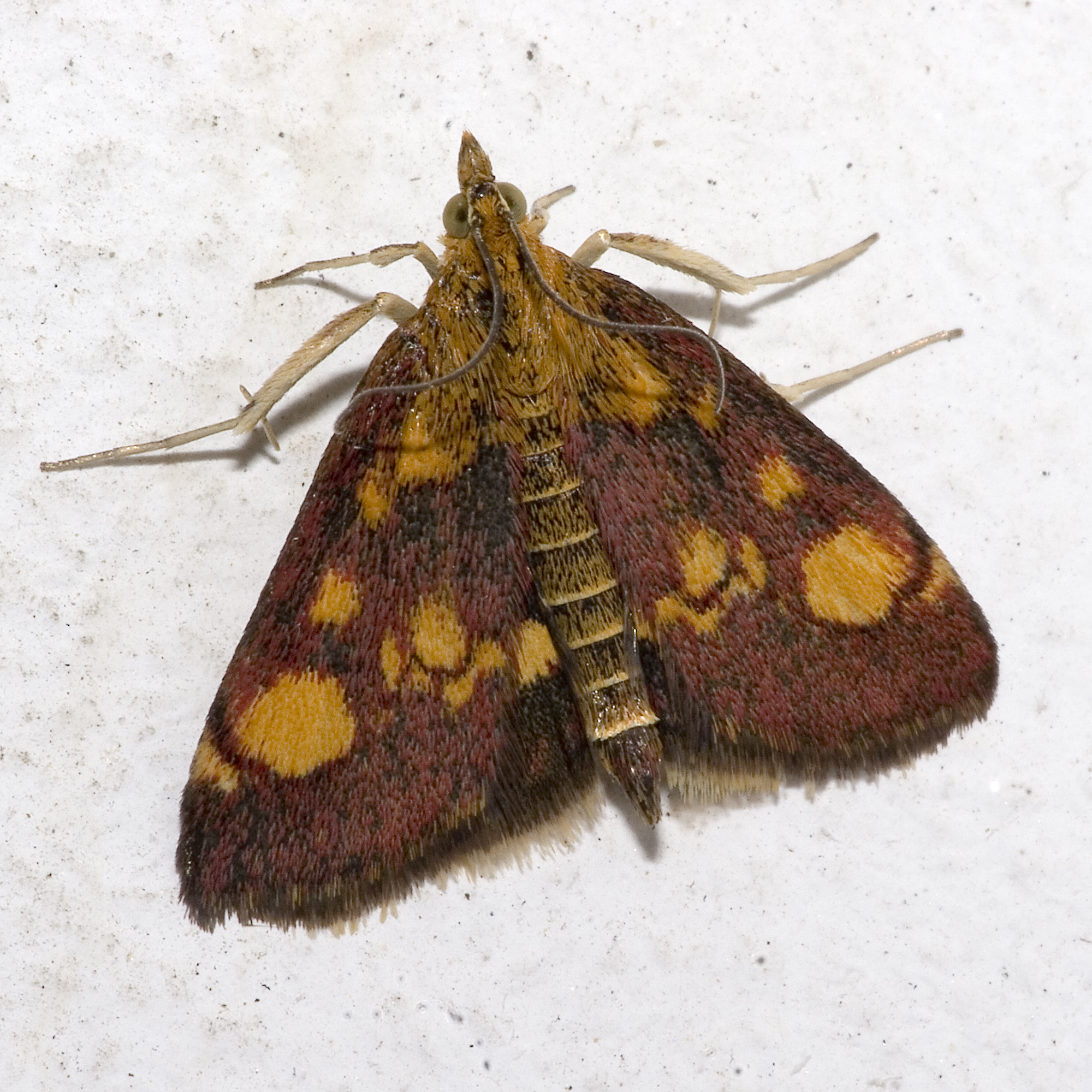

Scientific classification
- Kingdom: Animalia
- Phylum: Arthropoda
- Clade: Pancrustacea
- Class: Insecta
- Order: Lepidoptera
- Family: Crambidae
- Genus: Pyrausta
- Species: P. aurata

Binomial name
- Pyrausta aurata (Scopoli, 1763)

Synonyms
- Pyrausta deficiens Dufrane, 1957; Pyrausta inciae Koçak, 1981; Botys purpuralis var. meridionalis Staudinger, 1879

= Mint moth =

Species of moth

The mint moth (Pyrausta aurata) is a small moth from the family Crambidae, also known by the common name small purple and gold.

== Distribution ==
This species can be found in most of Europe and it is also widespread in North Africa and North Asia. In the east it is present from Siberia to North China, Korea and Japan, in the south, it covers Asia Minor, the Middle East, Iran, Afghanistan, Middle Asia and Mongolia.

== Habitat ==
These moths inhabit chalk and limestone grassland, woodland, marshland and gardens.

== Description ==
video of Pyrausta aurata

Pyrausta aurata has a wingspan of 18–20 millimetres (0.7–0.8 in). The forewings are purplish-brown with golden yellow markings. The number and intensity of these markings is quite variable. Usually in the forewings there is a single postmedian round golden spot near the costa, often with some other minor golden spots. The yellow spots can also be greatly reduced up to complete absence. Sometimes there is an almost indistinct wavy golden postmedian line between the dorsum and the main golden spot. The hindwings are dark brown or also black with a broad yellow transverse band approximately in the wing center and without additional spot closer to the basal area.

The moth is very similar to the related Pyrausta purpuralis, a slightly larger moth with a broad postmedian continuous band, usually divided into at least three yellow spots.

The caterpillar can reach a length of 13 mm. It may be light green, dark green, light brown, black, grey, or reddish, with a darker back line. The head is brownish black. The pupa is quite slender, red-brown to black-brown.

== Biology ==
In the UK, it has two broods; in May/June, and July/August. In north-west Europe it can be seen from April until the end of September and is capable of having two generations in each season.

It flies both at day and at night. As the name suggests, the mint moth often uses mint (Mentha spicata. Mentha rotundifolia) as a food plant, though it can also be found on other species such as marjoram, Salvia pratensis, Melissa officinalis, Nepeta cataria and Calamintha species.

== Gallery ==
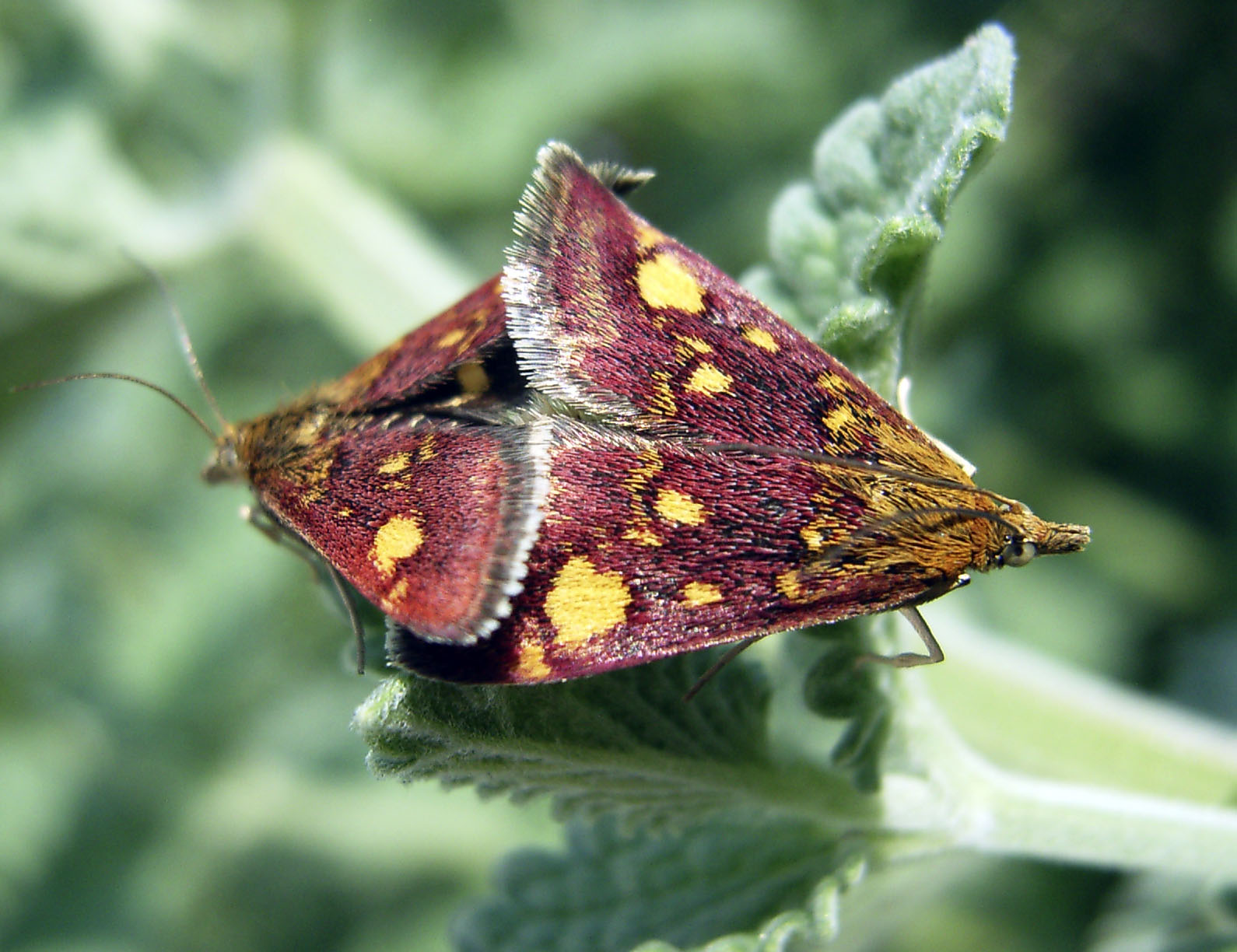
Mating

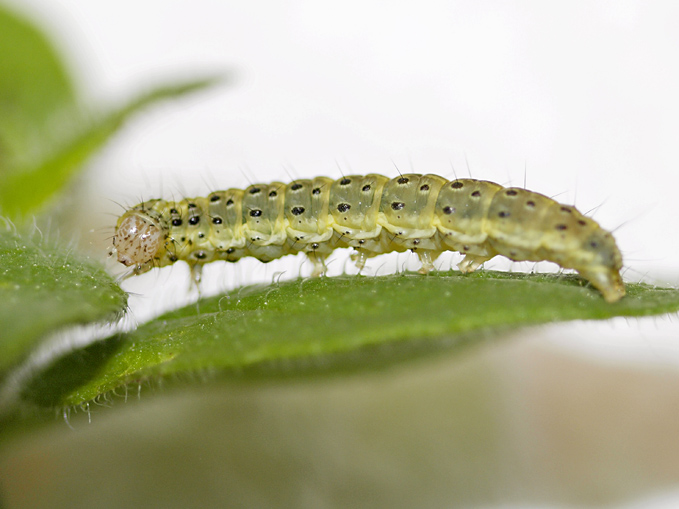
Caterpillar

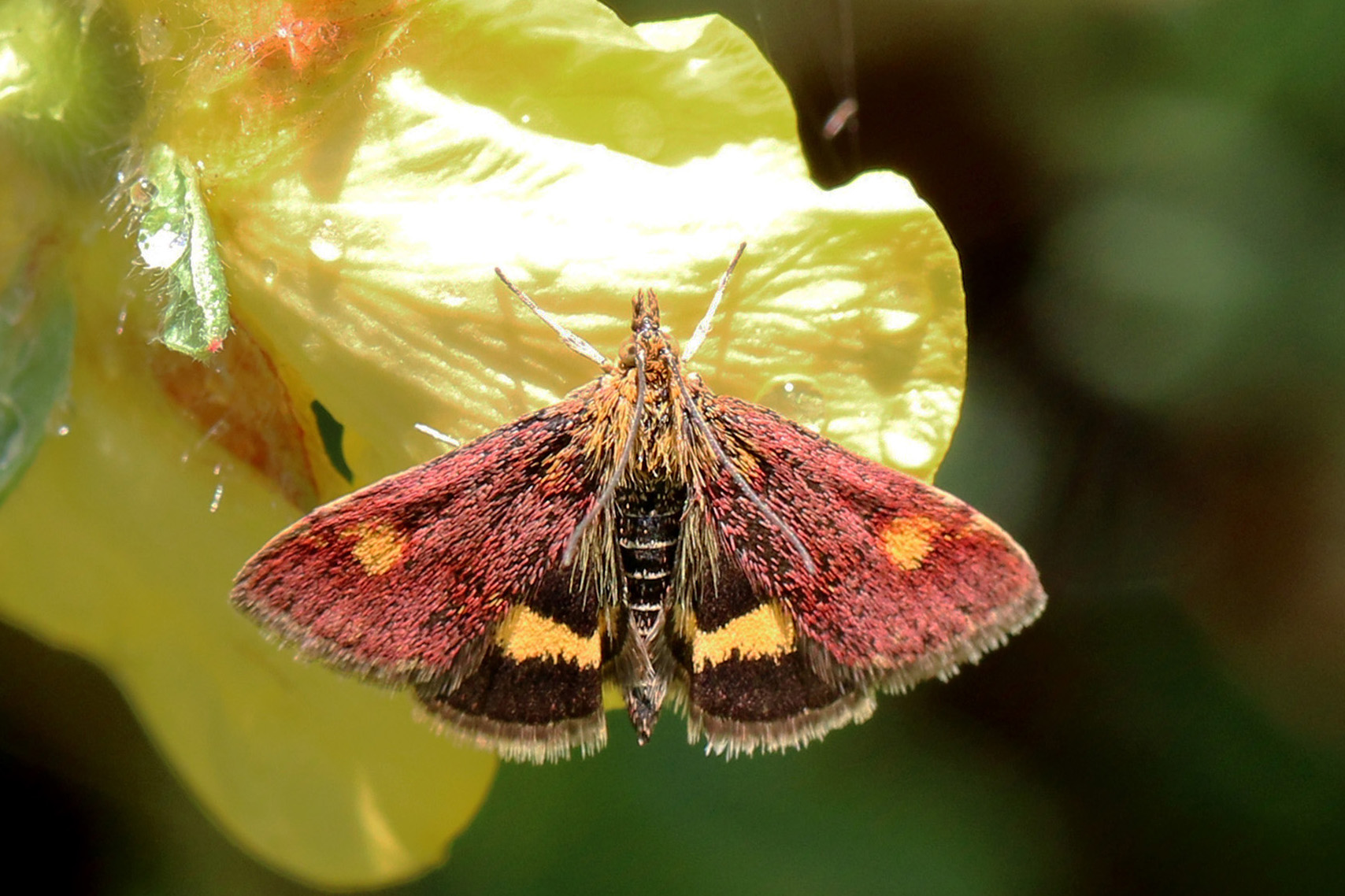
First brood.

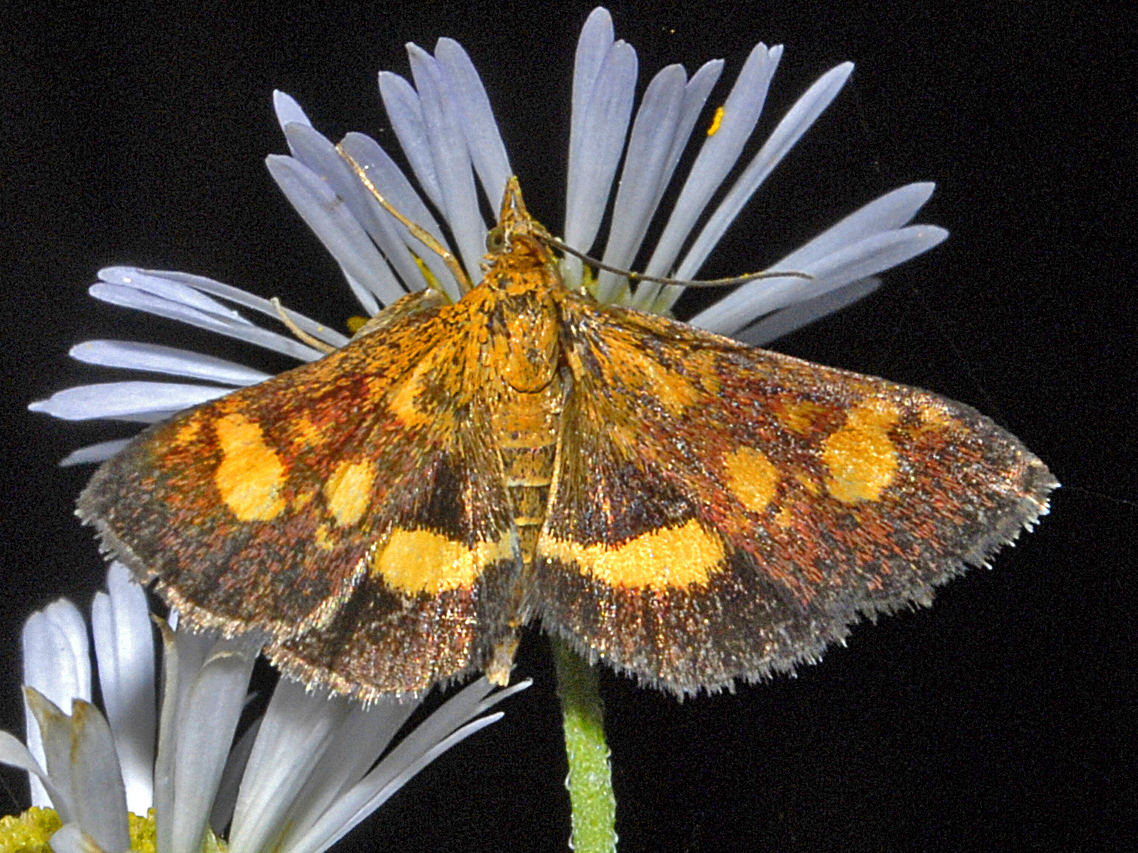
Second brood
