= Mentha divaricata =

Mentha divaricata may refer to two different species of plants:

- Mentha divaricata Host, a taxonomic synonym for corn mint (Mentha arvensis)
- Mentha divaricata Lag. ex Spreng., a taxonomic synonym for horse mint (Mentha longifolia)
