= Mentha pamiroalaica =

Scientific classification
- Kingdom: Plantae
- Clade: Tracheophytes
- Clade: Angiosperms
- Clade: Eudicots
- Clade: Asterids
- Order: Lamiales
- Family: Lamiaceae
- Genus: Mentha
- Species: M. pamiroalaica

Binomial name
- Mentha pamiroalaica Boriss.

Species of plant

Mentha pamiroalaica is a mint species within the genus Mentha, endemic to the Gissar Range in Tajikistan. The species was recorded by Russian botanist Antonina Borissova in 1954.

== Taxonomy ==
While it is accepted as a distinct species by authorities such as Plants of the World Online, some authors have treated Mentha pamiroalaica as simply a synonym of Mentha longifolia.

== Description ==
Mentha pamiroalaica is a perennial species, it grows to 60–160 centimeters in height and produces lilac-colored flowers. It produces ovate to oblong or lanceate leaves 8–10 centimeters in length.

== Use ==
Mentha pamiroalaica is eaten as food in traditional Uzbekistani cuisine.
