= Mentha uliginosa =

Mentha uliginosa may refer to three different species of plants:

- Mentha uliginosa Pérard, an unplaced species of plant that cannot be brought into synonymy
- Mentha uliginosa Salisb., a taxonomic synonym for horse mint (Mentha longifolia)
- Mentha uliginosa Strail, a taxonomic synonym for corn mint (Mentha arvensis)
