= Mentha crispa =

Mentha crispa may refer to two different species of plants:

- Mentha crispa L., a taxonomic synonym for spearmint (Mentha spicata)
- Mentha crispa Ten., a taxonomic synonym for horse mint (Mentha longifolia)
