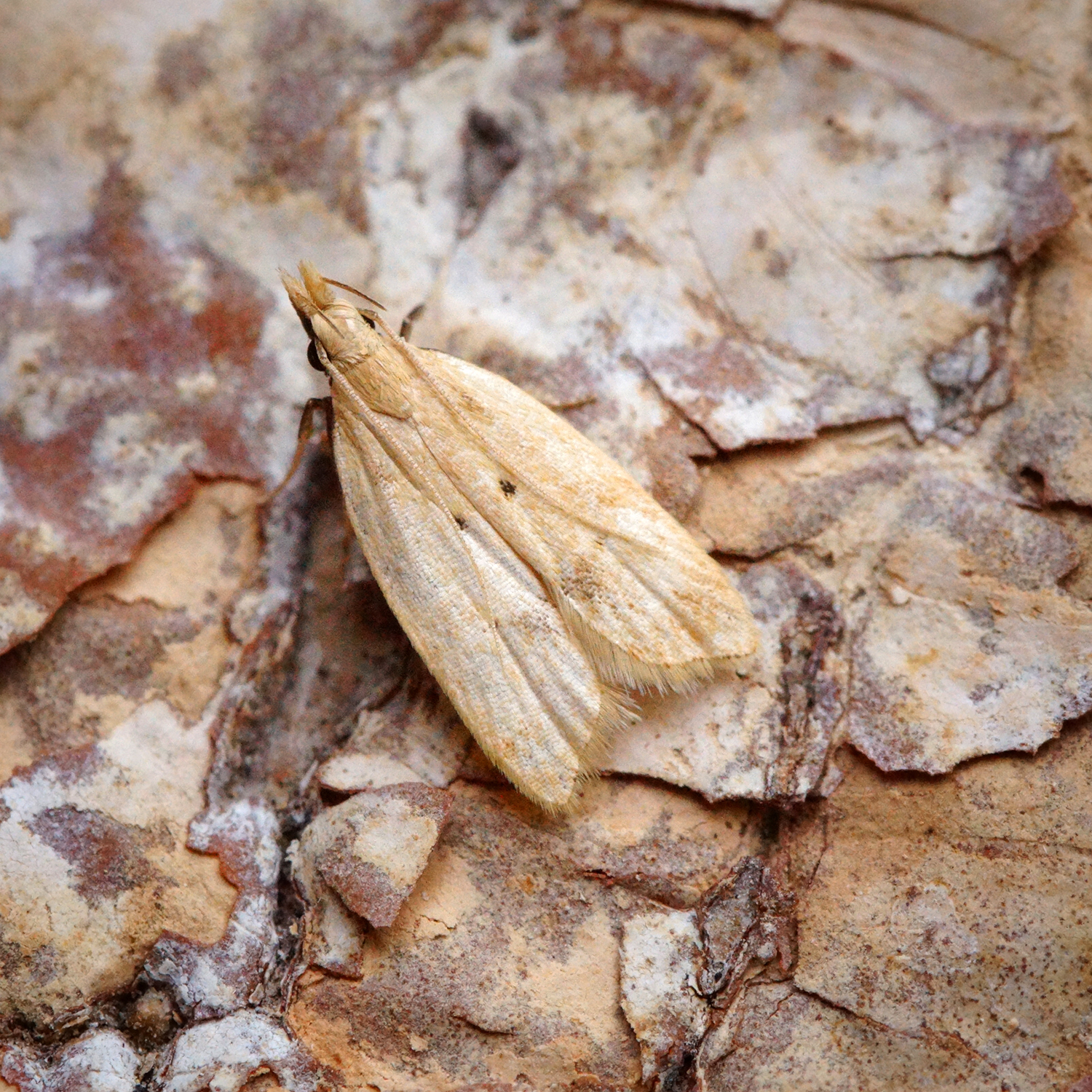
- Hexton, Hertfordshire, England

Scientific classification
- Domain: Eukaryota
- Kingdom: Animalia
- Phylum: Arthropoda
- Class: Insecta
- Order: Lepidoptera
- Family: Gelechiidae
- Genus: Acompsia
- Species: A. schmidtiellus

Binomial name
- Acompsia schmidtiellus (Heyden, 1848)

Synonyms
- Ypsolophus schmidtiellus Heyden, 1848; Ypsolophus durdhamellus Stainton, 1849; Hypsolopha quadrinella Herrich-Schäffer, 1854

= Acompsia schmidtiellus =

Species of moth

Acompsia schmidtiellus is a moth of the family Gelechiidae. It is found in central, eastern and southern Europe, from Denmark to southern Spain and Portugal. In the east, the range extends to Ukraine.

The wingspan is 14–16 mm for males and 15–17 mm for females. Adults are on wing from June to late August. The larvae feed on Origanum vulgare, Mentha arvensis, Mentha silvestris, Mentha rotundifolia, Calamintha nepeta and Clinopodium vulgare.
