= Mentha alaica =

Scientific classification
- Kingdom: Plantae
- Clade: Tracheophytes
- Clade: Angiosperms
- Clade: Eudicots
- Clade: Asterids
- Order: Lamiales
- Family: Lamiaceae
- Genus: Mentha
- Species: M. alaica

Binomial name
- Mentha alaica Boriss.

Species of plant

Mentha alaica is a mint species within the genus Mentha native to Central Asia.

== Description ==
A perennial species, Mentha alaica grows to a height of 1 metre (3 ft 3 in), and propagates via creeping rhizomes. It produces large oblong-lanceate leaves up to 10 centimetres (4 in) long.

== Taxonomy ==
The species was recorded by Russian botanist Antonina Borissova in 1954.

While it is accepted as a distinct species by authorities such as Plants of the World Online, some authors have treated M. alaica as simply a synonym of M. longifolia.

== Distribution and habitat ==
It is native to the Pamir-Alay mountain range within Tajikistan and Kyrgyzstan.

== Uses ==
Mentha alaica has been used in various formulations in Traditional Chinese Medicine. As an ingredient within this tradition, it is believed to "dispel pathogenic heat and wind." Under the common name Hortelã, M. alaica was reported used as an herbal medicine in Brazil to treat nausea, as well as digestive and kidney problems.
