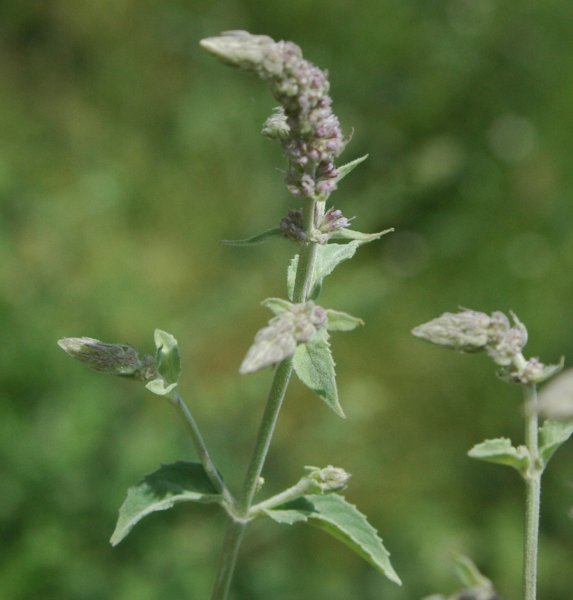
- Mentha asiatica

Scientific classification
- Kingdom: Plantae
- Clade: Tracheophytes
- Clade: Angiosperms
- Clade: Eudicots
- Clade: Asterids
- Order: Lamiales
- Family: Lamiaceae
- Genus: Mentha
- Species: M. longifolia
- Variety: M. l. var. asiatica

Trinomial name
- Mentha longifolia var. asiatica (Boriss.) Rech.f.

Synonyms
- Mentha asiatica Boriss.; Mentha asperata (Timb.-Lagr.) Pérard; Mentha kopetdaghensis Boriss.; Mentha vagans Boriss.

= Mentha longifolia var. asiatica =

Asian mint

Variety of flowering plant

Mentha longifolia var. asiatica is known by the common name Asian mint. It is a variety of the mint species Mentha longifolia. It has also been treated as the separate species, Mentha asiatica and Mentha vagans.

== Taxonomy ==
Mentha longifolia var. asiatica was first described as the species Mentha asiatica by Antonina Borissova in 1954. It was reduced to a variety of Mentha longifolia by Karl Heinz Rechinger in 1954.

== Distribution ==
Mentha longifolia var. asiatica is native to Central Asia (Kazakhstan, Kyrgyzstan, Turkmenistan, Tajikistan and Uzbekistan), Western Asia (Afghanistan, Iran and Iraq) and China (South Central China, Tibet and Xinjiang).

== Cultivation ==
Asian mint is a species of perennial herb that typically grows in full sun to partial shade. Asian mint prefers to grow in soil with adequate moisture retention year-round. It produces purple showy flowers that are fragrant. Unlike the other plants in the family Lamiaceace, Asian mint produces an unusual foliage color of leaves that are evergreen and opposites. Asian mint is suitable for wintersowing and handles well with transplanting. They do not typically come true from seed, similar to other mints, because mint seeds are highly variable and some varieties are sterile. An easier way to propagate is from cuttings from root, division, or even runners (stolons) from fully grown plants.
