= Mentha darvasica =

Scientific classification
- Kingdom: Plantae
- Clade: Tracheophytes
- Clade: Angiosperms
- Clade: Eudicots
- Clade: Asterids
- Order: Lamiales
- Family: Lamiaceae
- Genus: Mentha
- Species: M. darvasica

Binomial name
- Mentha darvasica Borissova

Species of plant

Mentha darvasica is a mint species within the genus Mentha, native to Darvaz, Tajikistan. The species was recorded by Russian botanist Antonina Borissova in 1954.

== Taxonomy ==
While it is accepted as a distinct species by authorities such as Plants of the World Online, some authors have treated Mentha darvasica as a synonym of Mentha longifolia.

== Description ==
A perennial species, Mentha darvasica grows stems 20–30 centimeters long, and propagates via rhizomes. It produces ovate to oblong-ovate leaves of 1 to 3 centimeters.

== Use ==
Mentha darvasica has been reported to have anthelmintic (antiparasitic) characteristics. It has been used against the nematodes Bunostomum, Chabertia ovina and Trichostrongylidae.
