= Acompsia muellerrutzi =

Scientific classification
- Kingdom: Animalia
- Phylum: Arthropoda
- Clade: Pancrustacea
- Class: Insecta
- Order: Lepidoptera
- Family: Gelechiidae
- Genus: Acompsia
- Species: A. muellerrutzi

Binomial name
- Acompsia muellerrutzi Wehrli, 1925

Species of moth

Acompsia muellerrutzi is a moth of the family Gelechiidae. It is found on Corsica and possibly Sardinia.

The wingspan is 15–16 mm for males. Adults are on wing from late June to early July.
