= Acompsia pyrenaella =

Scientific classification
- Kingdom: Animalia
- Phylum: Arthropoda
- Clade: Pancrustacea
- Class: Insecta
- Order: Lepidoptera
- Family: Gelechiidae
- Genus: Acompsia
- Species: A. pyrenaella

Binomial name
- Acompsia pyrenaella Huemer & Karsholt, 2002

Species of moth

Acompsia pyrenaella is a moth of the family Gelechiidae. It is found in the Pyrenees (France and Spain).

The wingspan is 18–21 mm (0.71–0.83 in) for males. Adults have been recorded on wing from early July to early August.
