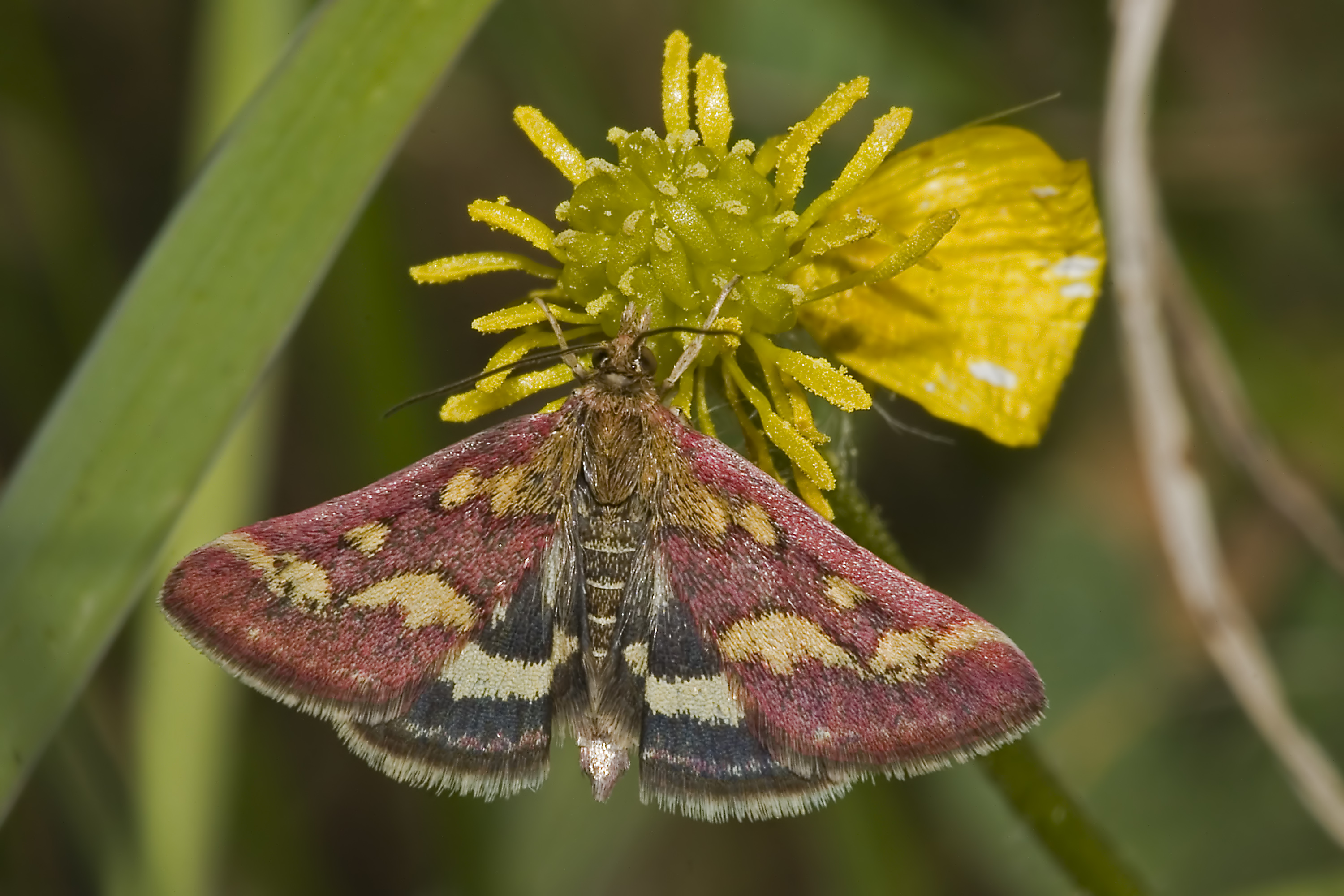

Scientific classification
- Kingdom: Animalia
- Phylum: Arthropoda
- Class: Insecta
- Order: Lepidoptera
- Family: Crambidae
- Genus: Pyrausta
- Species: P. purpuralis

Binomial name
- Pyrausta purpuralis (Linnaeus, 1758)

Synonyms
- Phalaena (Pyralis) purpuralis Linnaeus, 1758; Pyrausta purpuralis chermesinalis Guenée, 1854; Phalaena inflammata Scopoli, 1763; Pyralis punicealis Denis & Schiffermüller, 1775; Botys niepoldalis Lederer, 1863; Pyrausta confundalis Zetterstedt, 1839; Pyrausta melanalis Caradja, 1916

= Pyrausta purpuralis =

Species of moth

Pyrausta purpuralis is a species of moth of the family Crambidae. It was described by Carl Linnaeus in his 1758 10th edition of Systema Naturae

== Distribution ==
Is found in Europe.

== Description ==
The species closely resembles Pyrausta aurata and Pyrausta ostrinalis. It is also known by the common name Common Purple & Gold.

The wingspan is about 20 mm. The forewings are purple, more or less mixed with dark grey; markings ochreous yellow, black-edged; an oblique fascia near base, not reaching costa; a spot in middle of disc; an irregular postmedian fascia, sometimes broken into three spots; sometimes a subterminal streak, not reaching apex. Hindwings are black, base sometimes suffused with whitish-ochreous; a discal spot and curved postmedian fascia whitish-ochreous; sometimes a whitish-ochreous subterminal streak, sometimes purple in middle. The larva is dark grey; dorsal and spiracular lines yellowish; spots black, whitish-edged.

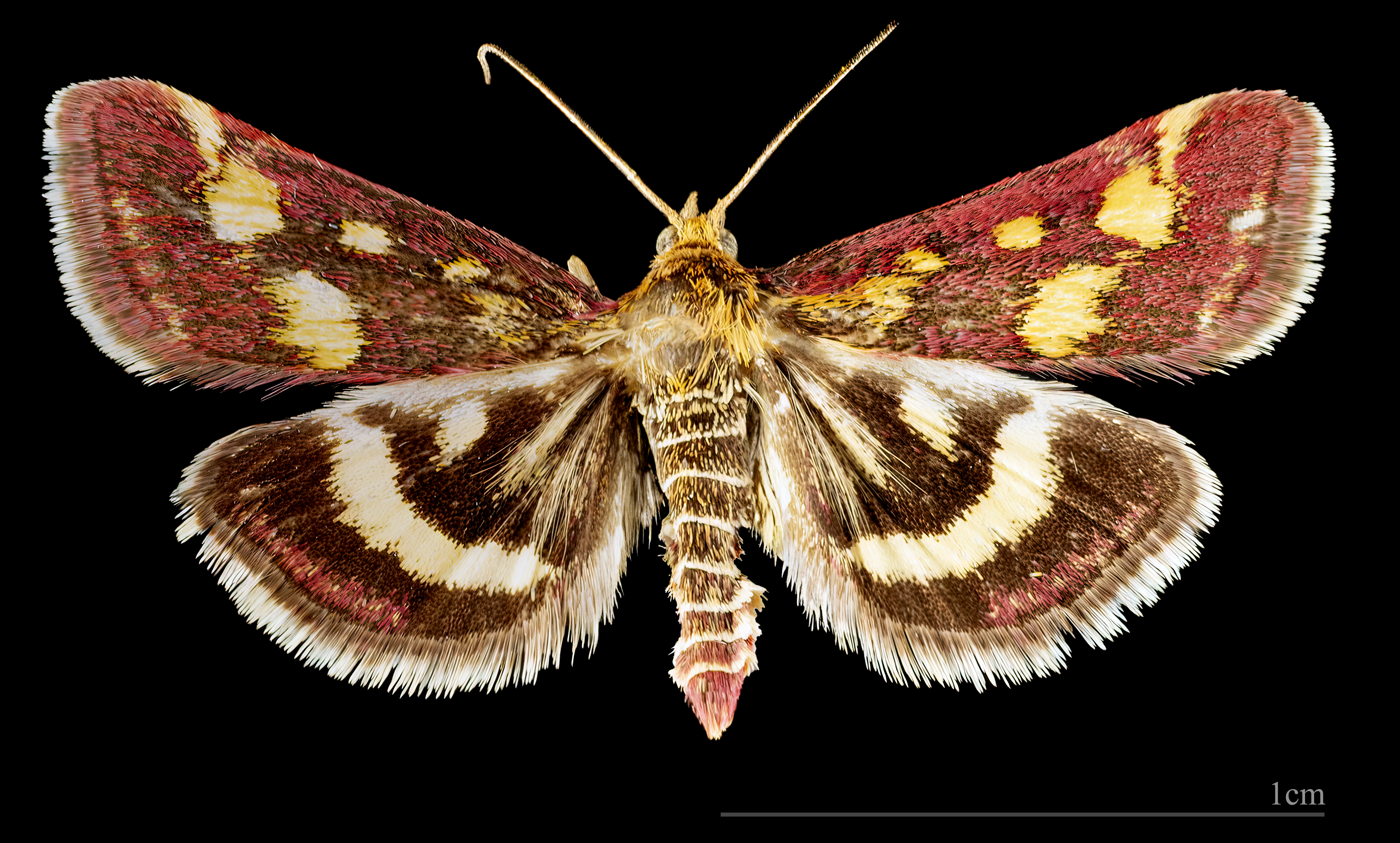
Pyrausta purpuralis ♂

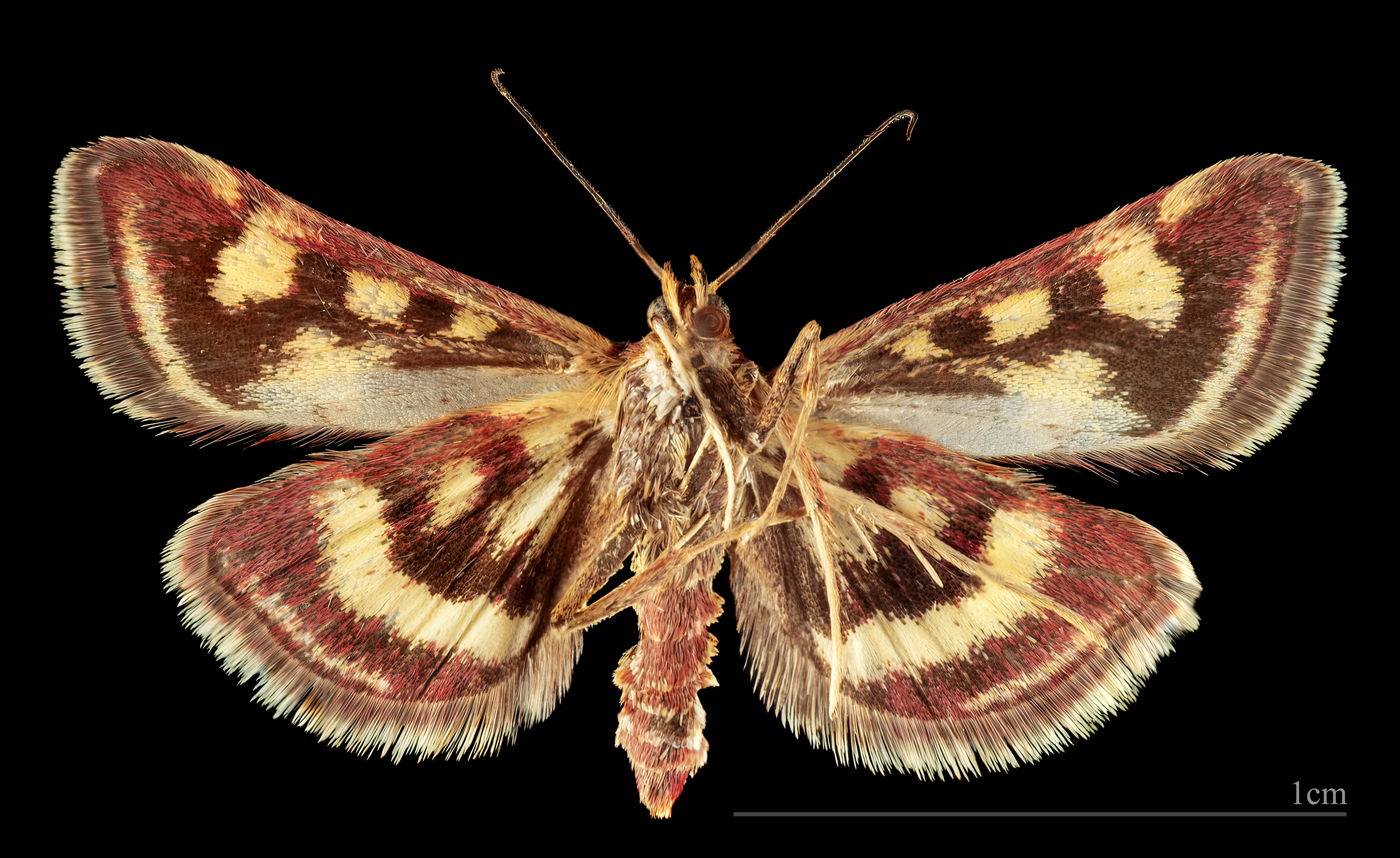
Pyrausta purpuralis ♂ △

== Biology ==
The moth flies from May to September depending on the location. The species is active during the day.

The larvae feed on mint.
