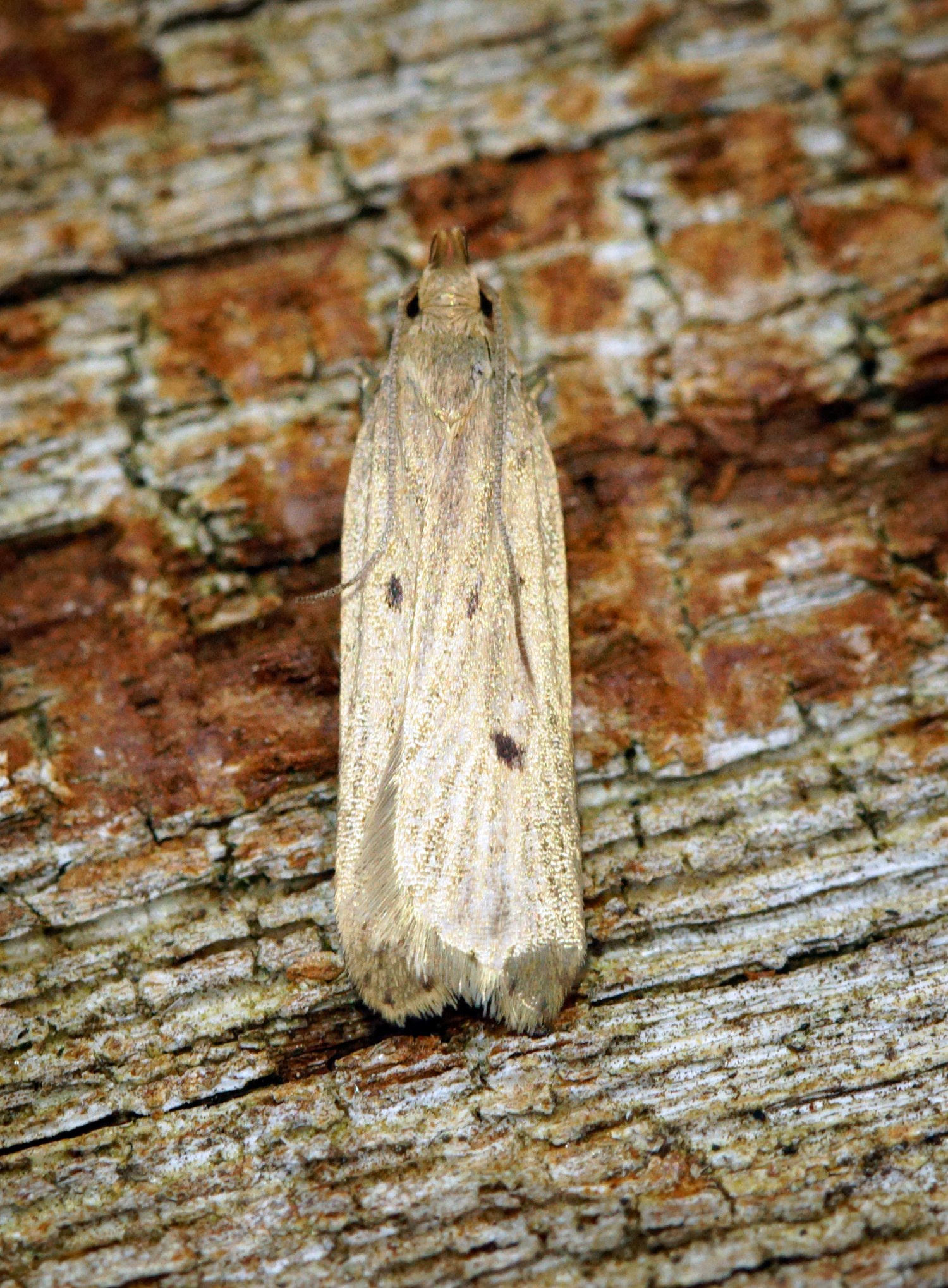

Scientific classification
- Domain: Eukaryota
- Kingdom: Animalia
- Phylum: Arthropoda
- Class: Insecta
- Order: Lepidoptera
- Family: Gelechiidae
- Genus: Acompsia
- Species: A. tripunctella

Binomial name
- Acompsia tripunctella (Denis & Schiffermüller, 1775)

Synonyms
- Tinea tripunctella Denis & Schiffermüller, 1775

= Acompsia tripunctella =

Species of moth

Acompsia tripunctella is a moth of the family Gelechiidae. It is found in the Alps, Apennines, Carpathians and the Balkans. There are also records from European Russia, Transbaikalia and the Caucasus, but these require confirmation. The habitat consists of clearings and edges of forests, steppe slopes and meadows up to the alpine zone.

The wingspan is 19–23 mm for males and 16–18 mm for females. Adults are on wing from June to September.

The larvae feed on Plantago alpina. Full-grown larvae reach a length of 12–13 mm. Pupation takes place in June on the ground in a loose cocoon.
