= Acompsia fibigeri =

Scientific classification
- Kingdom: Animalia
- Phylum: Arthropoda
- Clade: Pancrustacea
- Class: Insecta
- Order: Lepidoptera
- Family: Gelechiidae
- Genus: Acompsia
- Species: A. fibigeri

Binomial name
- Acompsia fibigeri Huemer & Karsholt, 2002

Species of moth

Acompsia fibigeri is a moth of the family Gelechiidae. It is endemic to eastern Turkey. The habitat consists of mountainous areas.

The wingspan is 22–23 mm (0.87–0.91 in) for males.
