= Acompsia caucasella =

Scientific classification
- Kingdom: Animalia
- Phylum: Arthropoda
- Clade: Pancrustacea
- Class: Insecta
- Order: Lepidoptera
- Family: Gelechiidae
- Genus: Acompsia
- Species: A. caucasella

Binomial name
- Acompsia caucasella Huemer & Karsholt, 2002

Species of moth

Acompsia caucasella is a moth of the family Gelechiidae. It is endemic to the Caucasus Mountains in Russia.

The wingspan is 19–22 mm (0.75–0.87 in) for males. The hindwings are grey. Adults are on wing in July.

== Etymology ==
The species is named after the type region.
