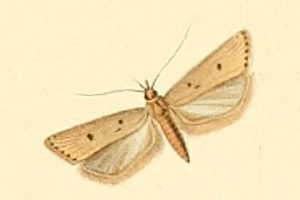

Scientific classification
- Domain: Eukaryota
- Kingdom: Animalia
- Phylum: Arthropoda
- Class: Insecta
- Order: Lepidoptera
- Family: Gelechiidae
- Genus: Acompsia
- Species: A. antirrhinella

Binomial name
- Acompsia antirrhinella (Millière, 1866)

Synonyms
- Gelechia antirrhinella Millière, 1866

= Acompsia antirrhinella =

Species of moth

Acompsia antirrhinella is a moth of the family Gelechiidae. It is found in southern France, Andorra and Spain.

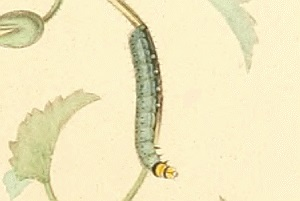
Larva

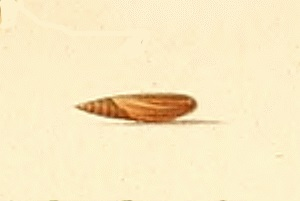
Pupa

The wingspan is 17–23 mm for males and 17–20 mm for females. Adults are on wing from late June to August.

Larvae can be found from March to the end of May. Pupation takes place at the base of the host plant.
