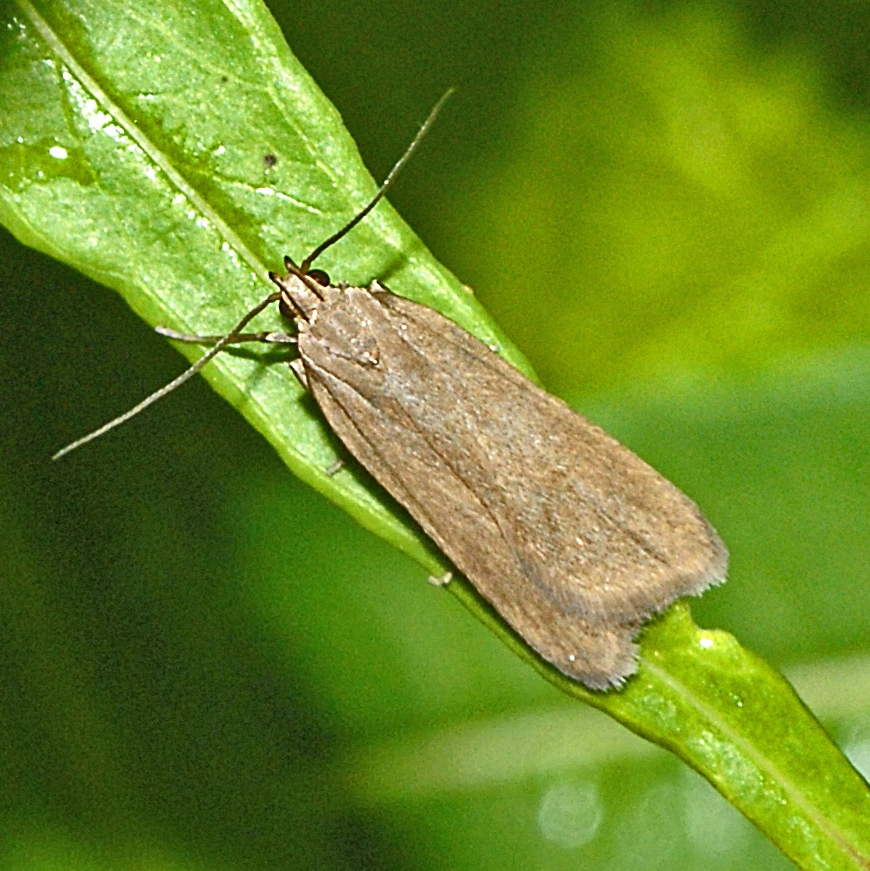
- Upperside

Scientific classification
- Kingdom: Animalia
- Phylum: Arthropoda
- Clade: Pancrustacea
- Class: Insecta
- Order: Lepidoptera
- Family: Gelechiidae
- Genus: Acompsia
- Species: A. cinerella

Binomial name
- Acompsia cinerella (Clerck, 1759)

Synonyms
- Phalaena cinerella Clerck, 1759; Phalaena murinella Scopoli, 1763; Tinea ardeliella Hübner, 1817; Recurvaria cinerea Haworth, 1828; Lita spodiella Treitschke, 1833

= Acompsia cinerella =

Ash-coloured sober

Species of moth

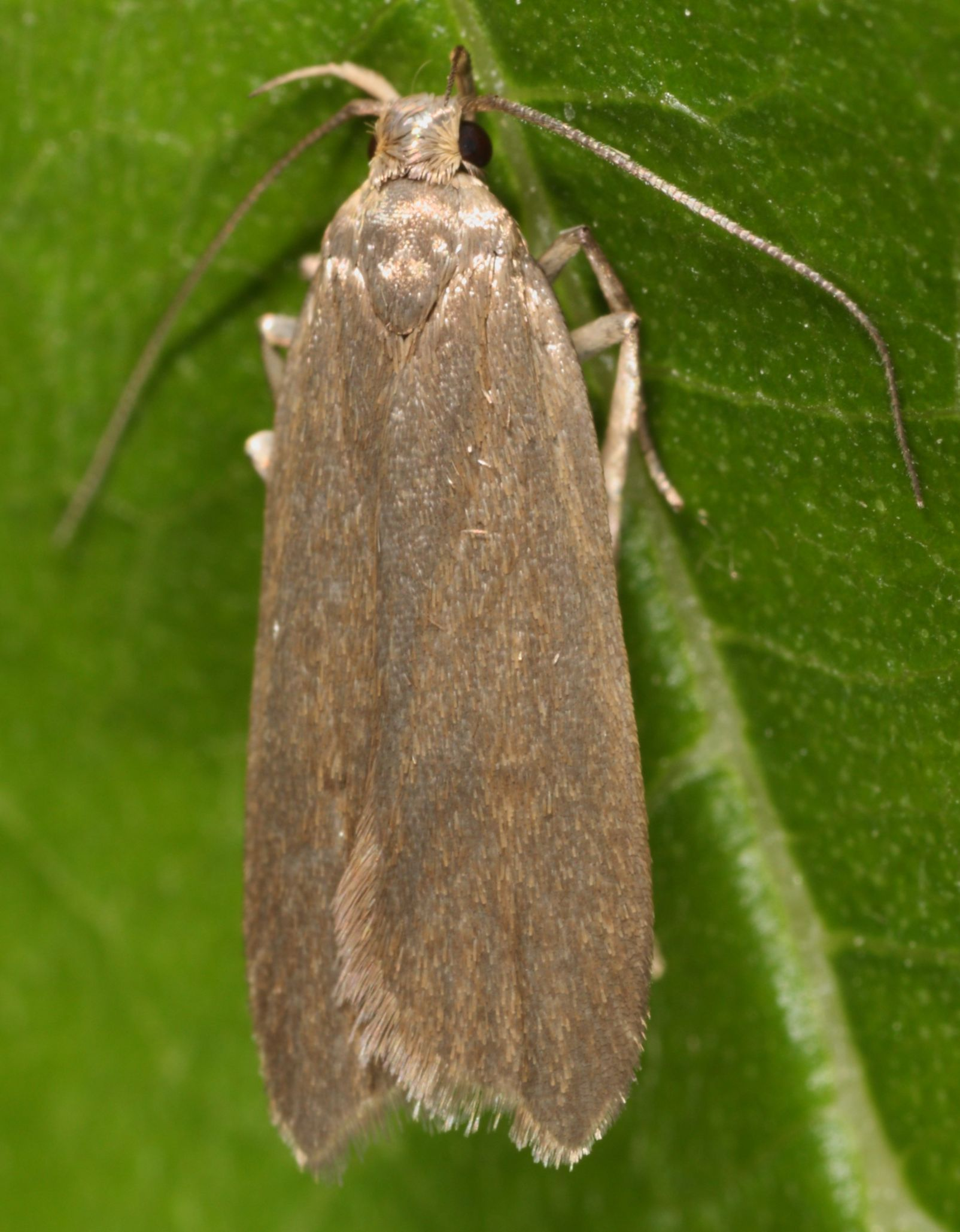
The long upwardly-curved labial palps in front of the antenna

Acompsia cinerella, the ash-coloured sober, is a small lepidopteran species of the twirler moth family (Gelechiidae). It is the type species of the genus Acompsia, once assigned to the subfamily Anacampsinae but generally placed in the Dichomeridinae. The species was first described by Carl Alexander Clerck in 1759.

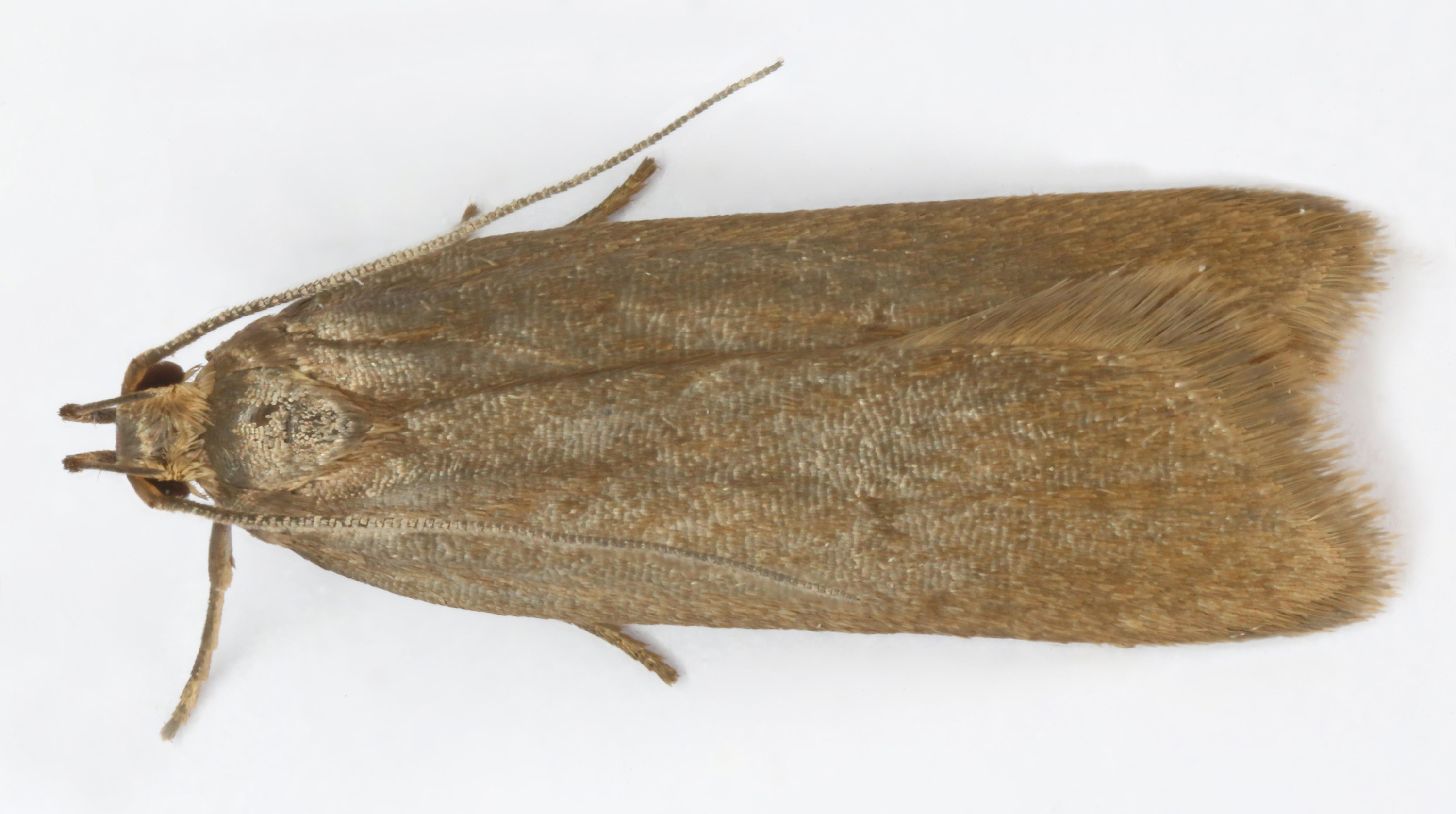
Specimen from North Wales

== Distribution ==
This species can be found in most of Europe, except for Portugal and Iceland.

== Habitat ==
These moths inhabit a variety of areas, preferably with rich vegetation or bushes.

== Description ==
Acompsia cinerella has a wingspan of 16–19 mm. These moths have long upwardly-curved labial palps. The forewings show a brownish colour, without any marking. This species is rather similar to Helcystogramma rufescens. Meyrick describes it - Forewings rather light greyish-brown; stigmata sometimes faintly darker. Hindwings grey.

== Biology ==
There are two generations per year, as it is a bivoltine species. Adults are on wing from May to September. The larvae feed on moss present on trunks of broad leaves trees, often at the base of the tree.

== Bibliography ==
- Erstbeschreibung: Clerck, C. (1759): Icones Insectorum rariorum Cum Nominibus eorum trivialibus, locisqve e C. LinnaeiArch. R. et Eqv. Aur. Syst. Nat. allegatis. Sectio Prima: [8 unpaginierte Textseiten], pl. 1-16. Holmiae. — Digitalisat der Bibliothèque nationale de France.
- Lectotypus-Festlegung: Robinson, G. S. & E. Schmidt Nielsen (1983): The Microlepidoptera described by Linnaeus and Clerck. — Systematic Entomology 8: 191–242.
