= Acompsia dimorpha =

Scientific classification
- Domain: Eukaryota
- Kingdom: Animalia
- Phylum: Arthropoda
- Class: Insecta
- Order: Lepidoptera
- Family: Gelechiidae
- Genus: Acompsia
- Species: A. dimorpha

Binomial name
- Acompsia dimorpha Petry, 1904

Species of moth

Acompsia dimorpha is a moth of the family Gelechiidae. It is found in the Pyrenees of France and Spain. The habitat consists of the alpine zone.

The wingspan is 16–20 mm for males and 11–13 mm for females. Adults are on wing from late July to early August.
