= Acompsia syriella =

Scientific classification
- Kingdom: Animalia
- Phylum: Arthropoda
- Clade: Pancrustacea
- Class: Insecta
- Order: Lepidoptera
- Family: Gelechiidae
- Genus: Acompsia
- Species: A. syriella

Binomial name
- Acompsia syriella Huemer & Karsholt, 2002

Species of moth

Acompsia syriella is a moth of the family Gelechiidae. It is endemic to Syria.

== Description ==
The wingspan is about 14 mm (0.55 in) for males.

== Behaviour ==
Adults have been recorded in mid May.
