= Acompsia tenebrosella =

Scientific classification
- Domain: Eukaryota
- Kingdom: Animalia
- Phylum: Arthropoda
- Class: Insecta
- Order: Lepidoptera
- Family: Gelechiidae
- Genus: Acompsia
- Species: A. tenebrosella

Binomial name
- Acompsia tenebrosella Lucas, 1955

Species of moth

Acompsia tenebrosella is a moth of the family Gelechiidae. It is found in Morocco. The species was described from a single male. The species probably does not belong in the genus Acompsia.
