= Acompsia ponomarenkoae =

Scientific classification
- Kingdom: Animalia
- Phylum: Arthropoda
- Clade: Pancrustacea
- Class: Insecta
- Order: Lepidoptera
- Family: Gelechiidae
- Genus: Acompsia
- Species: A. ponomarenkoae

Binomial name
- Acompsia ponomarenkoae Huemer & Karsholt, 2002

Species of moth

Acompsia ponomarenkoae is a moth of the family Gelechiidae. It occurs in Albania, Greece, and Bosnia and Herzegovina.

The wingspan is 20–24 mm (0.79–0.94 in) for males and 16–17 mm (0.63–0.67 in) for females. Adults are on wing from late May to late July.

== Etymology ==
The species is named for Dr. Margarita Ponomarenko who discovered its distinctness independently of the scientists who described the species.
