= Acompsia bidzilyai =

Scientific classification
- Kingdom: Animalia
- Phylum: Arthropoda
- Clade: Pancrustacea
- Class: Insecta
- Order: Lepidoptera
- Family: Gelechiidae
- Genus: Acompsia
- Species: A. bidzilyai

Binomial name
- Acompsia bidzilyai Huemer & Karsholt, 2002

Species of moth

Acompsia bidzilyai is a moth of the family Gelechiidae. It is endemic to Transbaikalia in Russia. It is named for Oleksiy Bidzilya, who collected the holotype.

The wingspan is 19–20 mm (0.75–0.79 in) for males.
