= Acompsia maculosella =

Scientific classification
- Kingdom: Animalia
- Phylum: Arthropoda
- Clade: Pancrustacea
- Class: Insecta
- Order: Lepidoptera
- Family: Gelechiidae
- Genus: Acompsia
- Species: A. maculosella

Binomial name
- Acompsia maculosella (Stainton, 1851)

Synonyms
- Gelechia maculosella Stainton, 1851

Species of moth

Acompsia maculosella is a moth of the family Gelechiidae. It is found in the central and eastern parts of the Alps, where it is known from Austria, Slovenia, Switzerland, Italy and Germany. It is found in montane habitats, including subalpine and alpine meadows and shrubs.

The wingspan is 16–21 mm for males and about 16 mm for females. Adults are on wing from July to August.
