= Acompsia subpunctella =

Scientific classification
- Domain: Eukaryota
- Kingdom: Animalia
- Phylum: Arthropoda
- Class: Insecta
- Order: Lepidoptera
- Family: Gelechiidae
- Genus: Acompsia
- Species: A. subpunctella

Binomial name
- Acompsia subpunctella Svensson, 1966

Species of moth

Acompsia subpunctella is a moth of the family Gelechiidae. It is found in Sweden, Finland, Estonia, Latvia, north-western Poland and Russia (the Kola Peninsula, Altai and Transbaikalia).

The wingspan is 15–17 millimetres (0.59–0.67 in) for males and 13–14 millimetres (0.51–0.55 in) for females.
