= Acompsia schepleri =

Scientific classification
- Kingdom: Animalia
- Phylum: Arthropoda
- Clade: Pancrustacea
- Class: Insecta
- Order: Lepidoptera
- Family: Gelechiidae
- Genus: Acompsia
- Species: A. schepleri

Binomial name
- Acompsia schepleri Huemer & Karsholt, 2002

Species of moth

Acompsia schepleri is a moth of the family Gelechiidae. It is endemic to central Turkey where it is known from a single mountain in the Erzincan Province. It is named after the collector of the type series, the Danish lepidopterist Fritz Schepler.

The wingspan is 22–24 mm (0.87–0.94 in) for males.
