= Acompsia delmastroella =

Scientific classification
- Kingdom: Animalia
- Phylum: Arthropoda
- Clade: Pancrustacea
- Class: Insecta
- Order: Lepidoptera
- Family: Gelechiidae
- Genus: Acompsia
- Species: A. delmastroella

Binomial name
- Acompsia delmastroella Huemer, 1998

Species of moth

Acompsia delmastroella is a moth of the family Gelechiidae. It is found in the south-western Alps (Alpi Cozie, Alpes Maritimes, Alpes-de-Haute-Provence). The habitat consists of alpine meadows.

The wingspan is 15–16 mm for males and 13–14 mm for females. Adults are on wing from July to mid-August. Adults have been observed in the flowers of Helianthemum nummularium.
