= Acompsia minorella =

Scientific classification
- Domain: Eukaryota
- Kingdom: Animalia
- Phylum: Arthropoda
- Class: Insecta
- Order: Lepidoptera
- Family: Gelechiidae
- Genus: Acompsia
- Species: A. minorella

Binomial name
- Acompsia minorella (Rebel, 1899)

Synonyms
- Brachycrossata minorella Rebel, 1899

Species of moth

Acompsia minorella is a moth of the family Gelechiidae. It is found in Austria, the Czech Republic, France, Italy, Slovenia and Switzerland. The habitat consists of warm forest steppes.

The wingspan is about 15 mm for males and females. Adults are on wing from May to June and again from July to September, probably in two generations per year.
