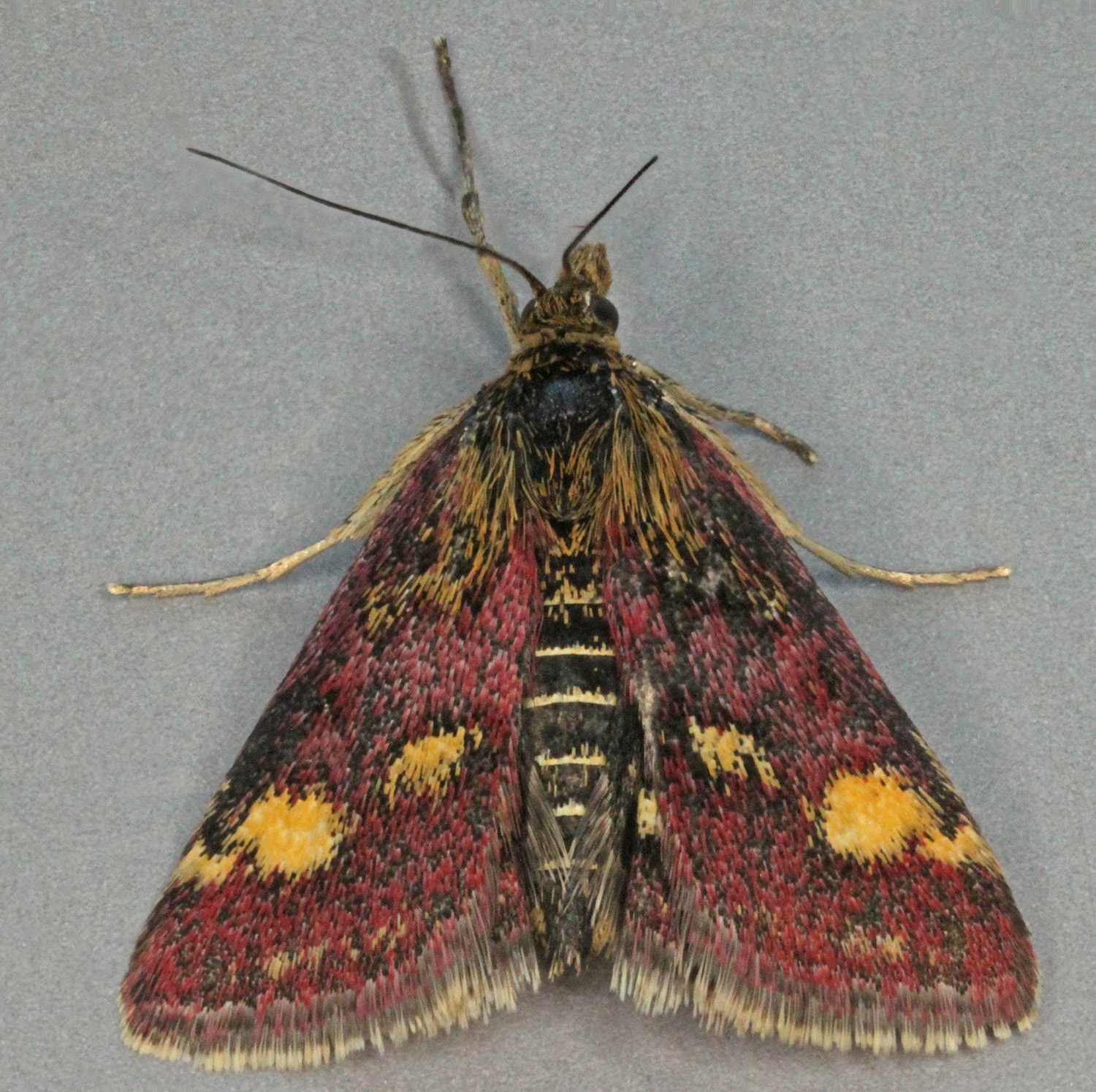
- Pyrausta ostrinalis photographed at Eyarth Rocks, Wales

Scientific classification
- Kingdom: Animalia
- Phylum: Arthropoda
- Clade: Pancrustacea
- Class: Insecta
- Order: Lepidoptera
- Family: Crambidae
- Genus: Pyrausta
- Species: P. ostrinalis

Binomial name
- Pyrausta ostrinalis (Hübner, 1796)

Synonyms
- Pyralis ostrinalis Hübner, 1796; Pyrausta ostrinalis guillaumei Leraut, 2001; Pyrausta moestalis Duponchel, 1831; Pyrausta guillaumei P. Leraut, 2001; Pyrausta melanalis Caradja, 1916

= Pyrausta ostrinalis =

Species of moth

Pyrausta ostrinalis, also called the scarce purple and gold, is a species of moth of the family Crambidae. It was described by Jacob Hübner in 1796 and is found in Europe and North Africa.

The wingspan is 15–21 mm. It is very similar to Pyrausta purpuralis but ostrinalis has a narrower forewing and the yellow markings are paler. There are slight differences in the underside wing pattern.
