= Cathegesis =

Scientific classification
- Domain: Eukaryota
- Kingdom: Animalia
- Phylum: Arthropoda
- Class: Insecta
- Order: Lepidoptera
- Family: Gelechiidae
- Subfamily: Dichomeridinae
- Genus: Cathegesis; Walsingham, 1910

Genus of moths

Cathegesis is a genus of moths in the family Gelechiidae.

== Species ==
- Cathegesis angulifera (Walsingham, 1897)
- Cathegesis psoricopterella (Walsingham, [1892])
- Cathegesis vinitincta Walsingham, 1910
