= Cathegesis psoricopterella =

Scientific classification
- Kingdom: Animalia
- Phylum: Arthropoda
- Clade: Pancrustacea
- Class: Insecta
- Order: Lepidoptera
- Family: Gelechiidae
- Genus: Cathegesis
- Species: C. psoricopterella

Binomial name
- Cathegesis psoricopterella (Walsingham, [1892])

Synonyms
- Brachycrossata psoricopterella Walsingham, [1892]; Acompsia psoricopterella Walsingham, 1891

Species of moth

Cathegesis psoricopterella is a moth in the family Gelechiidae. It was described by Thomas de Grey, 6th Baron Walsingham, in 1892. It is found on the West Indies.

The wingspan is about 10 mm. The forewings are mottled with pale cinereous and fuscous in about equal proportions. The latter predominating along the dorsal half to the anal angle and in two costal patches, the first scarcely before, the other beyond the middle. There is also a fuscous streak from the costa near the base, and a fuscous spot at the extreme apex followed by a fuscous line around the apical margin but not reaching to the anal angle. The hindwings are dark greyish.
