= Cathegesis angulifera =

Scientific classification
- Domain: Eukaryota
- Kingdom: Animalia
- Phylum: Arthropoda
- Class: Insecta
- Order: Lepidoptera
- Family: Gelechiidae
- Genus: Cathegesis
- Species: C. angulifera

Binomial name
- Cathegesis angulifera (Walsingham, 1897)

Synonyms
- Acompsia angulifera Walsingham, 1897

Species of moth

Cathegesis angulifera is a moth in the family Gelechiidae. It was described by Thomas de Grey, 6th Baron Walsingham, in 1897. It is found on the West Indies.

The wingspan is about 9 mm. The forewings are hoary greyish, with slight greyish-fuscous speckled shading. There is a small elongate blackish spot at the base of the costa and a blackish transverse spot on the fold at one-fourth from the base, followed by a smaller length-spot in the fold. There is also an outwardly oblique greyish fuscous shade at the middle of the costa, mixed with some chestnut scales, terminating in a slender curved line on the outer end of the cell. Before the apex is a slender hoary whitish transverse fascia, slightly angulated outwards on the middle and preceded by a greyish-fuscous shade mixed with some chestnut. The pale fascia is connected at each extremity with an internally dark margined pale line which passes around the base of the cilia, interrupted only at the extreme apex and forming a triangular pattern. A reduplicated slender fuscous and chestnut line runs through the hoary cilia along the termen. The hindwings are leaden grey.
