= Cathegesis vinitincta =

Scientific classification
- Domain: Eukaryota
- Kingdom: Animalia
- Phylum: Arthropoda
- Class: Insecta
- Order: Lepidoptera
- Family: Gelechiidae
- Genus: Cathegesis
- Species: C. vinitincta

Binomial name
- Cathegesis vinitincta Walsingham, 1910

Species of moth

Cathegesis vinitincta is a moth in the family Gelechiidae. It was described by Thomas de Grey in 1910. It is found in Mexico (Vera Cruz) and Guatemala.

The wingspan is about 16 mm. The forewings are shining, tawny greyish fuscous, with a broad semicircular chocolate-brown dorsal patch reaching from near the base to near the middle, its upper third crossing the fold. There is an elongate chocolate-brown streak from the outer end of the cell nearly reaching the termen below the apex. The apex itself is rounded, but the form of the tawny brownish cilia above it gives the depressed costa a strongly angulate appearance before it. A pale cinereous line runs around the base of the tawny greyish terminal cilia. The hindwings are bronzy brown.
