= Antonina Borissova =

Russian botanist

- Born: 1903
- Died: 1970 (aged 66–67)
- Known for: Central Asian flora
- Scientific career
- Fields: Botany
- Author abbrev. (botany): Boriss.

Antonina Georgievna Borissova (1903–1970) was a Soviet botanist, specialising in the flora of the deserts and semi-desert of central Asia. Borissova authored 195 land plant species names.

== Plants ==
Among the plants she identified are:

- Rhodiola arctica Boriss.= sin. de Rhodiola rosea (L.) (planta de la estepa rusa, que potencia el organismo, y en particular la actividad reproductiva). (Crassulaceae)
- Rhodiola rosea L. subsp. arctica (Boriss.) Á.Löve & D.Löve
- Rhodiola coccinea (Royle) Boriss. (Crassulaceae)
- Rhodiola heterodonta (Hook.f. & Thomson) Boriss. (Crassulaceae)
- Rhodiola iremelica Boriss. (Crassulaceae)
- Rhodiola komarovii Boriss. (Crassulaceae)
- Rhodiola linearifolia Boriss. (Crassulaceae)
- Rhodiola pamiroalaica Boriss. (Crassulaceae)
- Rhodiola pinnatifida Boriss. (Crassulaceae)
- Rhodiola recticaulis Boriss. (Crassulaceae)
- Hyssopus cuspidatus Boriss. (Lamiaceae).
- Hyssopus tianschanicus Boriss. (Lamiaceae)
- Mentha alaica Boriss. (Lamiaceae)
- Mentha darvasica Boriss. (Lamiaceae)
- Mentha pamiroalaica Boriss. (Lamiaceae)
- Astragalus inopinatus Boriss. (Fabaceae)

These species of succulent are named in her honour:

- Sedum borissovae Balk.
- Sempervivum borissovae Wale 1946
