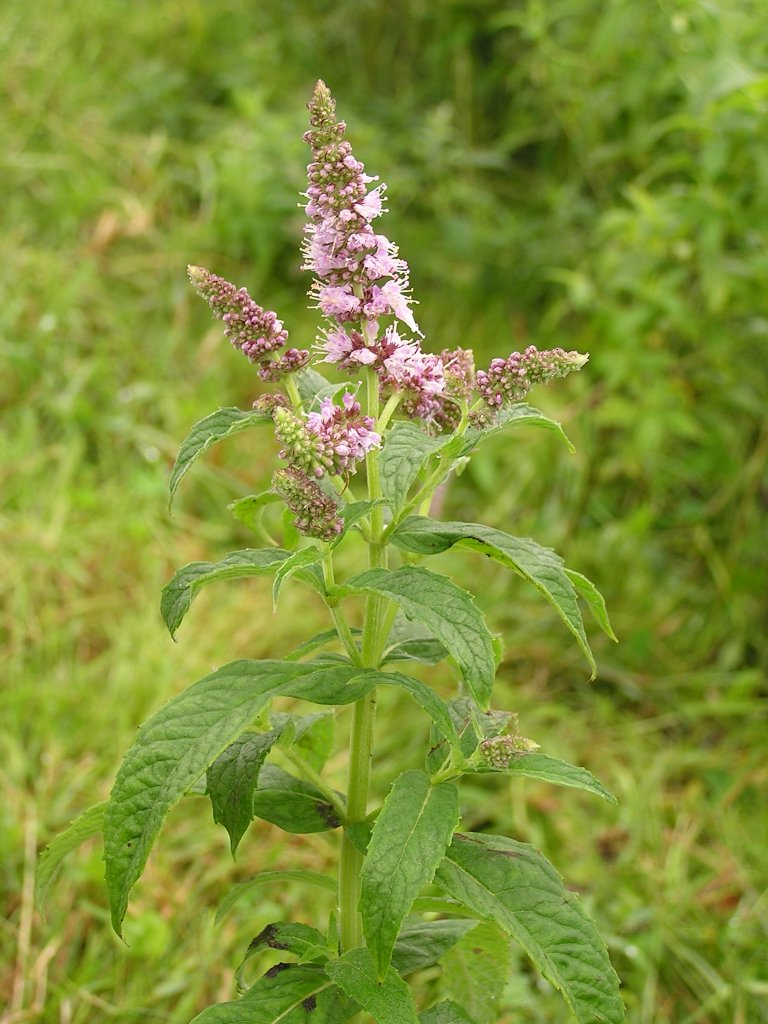

Scientific classification
- Kingdom: Plantae
- Clade: Embryophytes
- Clade: Tracheophytes
- Clade: Angiosperms
- Clade: Eudicots
- Clade: Asterids
- Order: Lamiales
- Family: Lamiaceae
- Genus: Mentha
- Species: M. longifolia

Binomial name
- Mentha longifolia (L.) Huds.

Synonyms
- List: Mentha acroceraia (Topitz) Trautm.; Mentha acuminata Topitz; Mentha aepycaulos Candargy; Mentha aequifrons Trautm. & Urum.; Mentha albida Déségl. & T.Durand ex Briq.; Mentha albida Rchb. ex Heinr.Braun; Mentha alpigena A.Kern.; Mentha ambigua Guss.; Mentha aquatica var. gracilis Wimm. & Grab.; Mentha bacsensis Trautm.; Mentha baldensis Heinr.Braun; Mentha balsamiflora Heinr.Braun; Mentha bezdanensis Prodan; Mentha brachyclada Sennen; Mentha brassoensis (Topitz) Trautm.; Mentha brevidentata Sennen; Mentha brevispicata Opiz ex Strail; Mentha brittingeri Opiz; Mentha caerulescens Opiz ex Strail; Mentha candicans Mill.; Mentha candicans f. angustifolia (Lapeyr.) Timb.-Lagr.; Mentha candicans f. leptostachya Pérard; Mentha candicans f. ramosa Timb.-Lagr.; Mentha canescens Roth; Mentha cardiophyllos Borbás ex Heinr.Braun; Mentha castellana Sennen & Elías; Mentha caucasica Gand.; Mentha caucasica (Briq.) Vorosch.; Mentha chaunanthera (Topitz) Trautm.; Mentha chrysostomi Sennen; Mentha coerulescens Opiz ex Déségl.; Mentha collivaga (Briq.) Trautm.; Mentha cordata Posp.; Mentha cretica Port. ex Heinr.Braun; Mentha crispa Ten.; Mentha cuspidata Opiz ex Déségl.; Mentha danubialis Borbás & Heinr.Braun; Mentha danubialis Gand.; Mentha decloetiana Opiz; Mentha densicapilla (Briq.) Trautm.; Mentha despecta Sennen; Mentha dionisiana Sennen; Mentha discolor Opiz ex Déségl.; Mentha divaricata Lag. ex Spreng.; Mentha domingoi Sennen; Mentha dulcissima Dumort.; Mentha × dumetorum var. hispidula (Boreau) Rouy; Mentha eisensteiniana Opiz; Mentha ensidens (Briq.) Trautm.; Mentha favratii Déségl. & T.Durand; Mentha filina Wallr.; Mentha firmicaulis (Briq.) Trautm.; Mentha flanatica Borbás ex Heinr.Braun; Mentha fluvialis Pérard; Mentha foliosa Opiz; Mentha foroiulensis (Topitz) Trautm.; Mentha glaucostachya (Topitz) Trautm.; Mentha grisella Briq.; Mentha grisella subsp. caucasica Briq.; Mentha grisella subsp. minutiflora Briq.; Mentha grisella subsp. seriata (A.Kern.) Briq.; Mentha grisella subsp. syriaca (Déségl.) Briq.; Mentha halleri C.C.Gmel.; Mentha hapalophylla (Briq.) Trautm.; Mentha hispidula Boreau; Mentha hollosyana Borbás; Mentha horridula (Briq.) Trautm.; Mentha hugueninii Déségl. & T.Durand; Mentha hybrida Schleich.; Mentha illyrica Borbás & Heinr.Braun; Mentha incana Willd.; Mentha incana f. barthiana Borbás; Mentha incana var. litoralis Borbás; Mentha ischnostachya (Topitz) Trautm.; Mentha josephi Sennen; Mentha jucunda Sennen; Mentha jurana (Déségl. & T.Durand) Heinr.Braun; Mentha kozorensis Trautm.; Mentha krassoensis Heinr.Braun; Mentha kuncii Borbás; Mentha laggeri Déségl. & T.Durand; Mentha lavandulacea Willd.; Mentha lavandulifolia Pers.; Mentha leioneura Borbás; Mentha lepidioides Legrand; Mentha lereschii Déségl. & T.Durand; Mentha leucantha Borbás ex Heinr.Braun; Mentha ligustrina Heinr.Braun; Mentha litigiosa Sennen; Mentha macilenta (Briq.) Trautm.; Mentha marisensis Simonk.; Mentha mellifluens Haw. ex Spach; Mentha mentita Sennen; Mentha microcephala (Gelmi) Dalla Torre & Sarnth.; Mentha microstachya Sennen; Mentha minutiflora A.Kern.; Mentha mixta Sennen; Mentha mollicoma Opiz ex Strail; Mentha mollis (Rochel) Trautm.; Mentha mollis f. leptostachya Borbás; Mentha mollis var. retinervis Borbás; Mentha mollissima Borkh.; Mentha mollissima var. bornmuelleri Heinr.Braun; Mentha mollissima f. exserta Pérard; Mentha mollissima f. inclusa Pérard; Mentha mollissima f. plicata Pérard; Mentha monticola Déségl. & T.Durand; Mentha monticola var. jurana Déségl. & T.Durand; Mentha mosztongensis Trautm.; Mentha nativitatis-mariae Sennen; Mentha neilreichiana Heinr.Braun; Mentha nematostachya (Topitz) Trautm.; Mentha × nemorosa var. crispa (Benth.) Timb.-Lagr.; Mentha × nemorosa subsp. dulcissima (Dumort.) Briq.; Mentha nigrescens K.Koch; Mentha × niliaca var. sapida (Tausch ex Rchb.) Briq.; Mentha noeana Boiss.; Mentha norica Heinr.Braun; Mentha nouletiana Timb.-Lagr.; Mentha oblonga Opiz; Mentha omissa Sennen; Mentha pachylodes (Briq.) Trautm.; Mentha pagana (Topitz) Domin; Mentha pallida Nees ex Mart.; Mentha panormitana Heinr.Braun; Mentha pantotricha (Briq.) Trautm.; Mentha paramecophyllon (Topitz) Trautm.; Mentha parviflora Sennen; Mentha pedroi Sennen; Mentha pellita Déségl.; Mentha persica Benth.; Mentha petitrix Sennen; Mentha phaeocoma (Briq.) Trautm.; Mentha planitiensis (Topitz) Trautm.; Mentha procera Sennen; Mentha psiloclada Sennen; Mentha ratisbonensis Opiz; Mentha recta Déségl. & T.Durand; Mentha reflexifolia Opiz; Mentha reflexifolia var. serrulata (Opiz ex Déségl.) Heinr.Braun; Mentha retinervis Borbás ex Heinr.Braun; Mentha rigens Déségl. & T.Durand; Mentha rocheliana Borbás & Heinr.Braun; Mentha rotundifolia Sole; Mentha × rotundifolia var. maritima Gadeceau; Mentha rozaliae Trautm.; Mentha sapida Tausch ex Rchb.; Mentha sedunensis Ayasse ex Briq.; Mentha seriata A.Kern.; Mentha serotina Ten.; Mentha serratula (Topitz) Trautm.; Mentha serrulata Opiz ex Déségl.; Mentha sphaerostachya Haussm. ex Heinr.Braun; Mentha spicata var. longifolia L.; Mentha spicata subsp. longifolia (L.) Tacik; Mentha spicata var. microphylla (Lej. & Courtois) Lebeau; Mentha stenantha Borbás ex Heinr.Braun; Mentha stenanthelmia (Topitz) Trautm.; Mentha stenoclada Sennen; Mentha stenostachya K.Richt.; Mentha stenotricha Borbás; Mentha suavis Hoffm. ex Sm.; Mentha suavissima Lej. ex Malinv.; Mentha subincana Heinr.Braun; Mentha subintegrifolia Déségl.; Mentha subviridis Borbás ex Heinr.Braun; Mentha sylvestris L.; Mentha sylvestris var. alpigena (A.Kern.) Nyman; Mentha sylvestris var. angustifolia Lapeyr.; Mentha sylvestris subsp. arctifrons Briq.; Mentha sylvestris subsp. brevifrons Borbás ex Briq.; Mentha sylvestris var. candicans Becker; Mentha sylvestris var. canescens Regel; Mentha sylvestris f. canescens Gaudin; Mentha sylvestris var. compacta Wimm. & Grab.; Mentha sylvestris var. crispa Benth.; Mentha sylvestris var. diffusa K.Koch; Mentha sylvestris var. discolor K.Koch; Mentha sylvestris subvar. domestica Tausch ex Nyman; Mentha sylvestris var. flaccida Wimm. & Grab.; Mentha sylvestris var. floribunda Wimm. & Grab.; Mentha sylvestris var. grandis Wimm. & Grab.; Mentha sylvestris subvar. hispidula (Boreau) Nyman; Mentha sylvestris var. hybrida (Schleich.) Gaudin; Mentha sylvestris var. iberica K.Koch; Mentha sylvestris var. incana (Willd.) Bastard; Mentha sylvestris subvar. incana (Willd.) Nyman; Mentha sylvestris var. lancifolia K.Koch; Mentha sylvestris subsp. lavandulacea Briq.; Mentha sylvestris var. major Wirtg.; Mentha sylvestris var. marisensis (Simonk.) Nyman; Mentha sylvestris var. microcephala Gelmi; Mentha sylvestris var. microphylla Lej. & Courtois; Mentha sylvestris f. minor Becker; Mentha sylvestris var. mollis Rochel; Mentha sylvestris var. mollissima (Borkh.) G.Gaertn., B.Mey. & Scherb.; Mentha sylvestris subsp. mollissima (Borkh.) Schübl. & G.Martens; Mentha sylvestris var. nouletiana (Timb.-Lagr.) Batt.; Mentha sylvestris f. pahinensis Topitz; Mentha sylvestris var. pallescens Heinr.Braun; Mentha sylvestris subsp. pellita (Déségl.) Briq.; Mentha sylvestris convar. planifolia Alef.; Mentha sylvestris subsp. procurrens Briq.; Mentha sylvestris var. serotina (Ten.) Nyman; Mentha sylvestris var. simplex Wimm. & Grab.; Mentha sylvestris var. sordida Wimm. & Grab.; Mentha sylvestris var. subintegra Wimm. & Grab.; Mentha sylvestris var. teydae Bolle; Mentha sylvestris var. thaumasia Murr; Mentha sylvestris f. tomentosa Wimm. & Grab.; Mentha sylvestris var. wierzbickiana (Opiz) Nyman; Mentha syriaca Déségl.; Mentha syrmiensis Borbás ex Heinr.Braun; Mentha szamosiana (Topitz) Trautm.; Mentha szenezyana Borbás; Mentha szilyana Borbás; Mentha taphrophila (Topitz) Trautm.; Mentha tenorei Pérard; Mentha thaumasia (Murr) Dalla Torre & Sarnth.; Mentha tomentosa Stokes; Mentha transmota Déségl. & T.Durand; Mentha transsilvanica Schur; Mentha uliginosa Salisb.; Mentha ulotricha (Topitz) Trautm.; Mentha vallesiaca (Briq.) Trautm.; Mentha veroniciformis Opiz ex Strail; Mentha × villosa f. nouletiana (Timb.-Lagr.) Topitz; Mentha × villosa var. sapida (Tausch ex Rchb.) Rouy; Mentha × villosa var. tenorei Briq.; Mentha viridescens Borbás; Mentha viridescens f. leioneura Borbás; Mentha viridescens f. macrostema Borbás; Mentha viridis subsp. candicans Berher; Mentha viridis var. canescens Gren. & Godr.; Mentha viridis var. minutodonta Topitz; Mentha viridis subsp. nouletiana (Timb.-Lagr.) Nyman; Mentha weinerniana Opiz ex Strail; Mentha wierzbickiana Opiz; Mentha wierzbickiana f. holubyana Heinr.Braun; Mentha wierzbickiana f. lintiae Heinr.Braun & Topitz; Mentha wierzbickiana var. richteri Borbás ex Heinr.Braun; Mentha wierzbickiana var. stenantha Borbás ex Heinr.Braun; Mentha wierzbickiana f. subcrispa Heinr.Braun & Topitz; Mentha wirzbickiana Opiz ex Déségl.; Mentha wondracekii Opiz ex Strail

= Mentha longifolia =

Species of flowering plant

Mentha longifolia, also known as horse mint, brookmint, fillymint or St. John's horsemint, is a species of plant in the family Lamiaceae. It is native to Europe excluding Britain and Ireland, western and central Asia (east to Nepal and far western China), and northern and southern (but not tropical) Africa.

== Description ==
It is a very variable herbaceous perennial plant with a peppermint-scented aroma. Like many mints, it has a creeping rhizome, with erect to creeping stems 40–120 cm (16–47 in) tall. The leaves are oblong-elliptical to lanceolate, 5–10 cm (2.0–3.9 in) long and 1.5–3 cm (0.6–1.2 in) broad, thinly to densely tomentose, green to greyish-green above and white below. The flowers are 3–5 mm long, lilac, purplish, or white, produced in dense clusters (verticillasters) on tall, branched, tapering spikes; flowering in mid to late summer. It spreads via rhizomes to form clonal colonies.

== Taxonomy ==
Mentha longifolia has been widely confused with tomentose variant plants of the species Mentha spicata; it can be distinguished from these by the hairs being simple and unbranched, in contrast to the branched hairs of M. spicata.

=== Infraspecies ===
The following subspecies and varieties are recognised:

- Mentha longifolia var. amphilema Briq. ex Rech.f. – western Asia
- Mentha longifolia var. asiatica (Boriss.) Rech.f. – western Asia to western China
- Mentha longifolia var. austroafghanica Rech.f. – Afghanistan
- Mentha longifolia subsp. capensis (Thunb.) Briq. – southern Africa
- Mentha longifolia var. chlorodictya Rech.f. – Caucasus to western & central Asia
- Mentha longifolia var. kermamensis Rech.f. – Iran
- Mentha longifolia var. kotschyana (Boiss.) Briq. – eastern Turkey, Iran
- Mentha longifolia subsp. longifolia (L.) L. – Europe, northwestern Africa
- Mentha longifolia var. muqarrabica Shinwari & Chaudhri – Pakistan
- Mentha longifolia subsp. noeana (Briq.) Briq. – Turkey east to Iran
- Mentha longifolia var. petiolata Boiss. – northern Iraq to northern & western Iran
- Mentha longifolia var. schimperi (Briq.) Briq. – Sinai to Arabian Peninsula
- Mentha longifolia var. swatica Shinwari & Chaudhri – Pakistan
- Mentha longifolia subsp. typhoides (Briq.) Harley. – northeastern Africa, southwestern Asia
- Mentha longifolia subsp. wissii (Launert) Codd. – southwestern Africa

=== Hybrids ===
Mentha longifolia hybridizes with other Mentha species. Hybrids include:

- Mentha × villosa-nervata Opiz. (hybrid with Mentha spicata) sharp toothed mint
- Mentha × rotundifolia (L.) Huds., 1782 (hybrid with Mentha suaveolens) false apple mint

=== Varieties and cultivars ===
Unlike other commonly cultivated species and hybrids of mint, there are few horticultural cultivars of M. longifolia. The only ones of note are:

- M. longifolia Buddleia Mint Group (syn. M. longifolia 'Buddleia') – with silvered leaves.

== Cultivation ==
Like almost all mints, Mentha longifolia can be invasive. Care needs to be taken when planting it in non-controlled areas.

== Uses ==
Nicholas Culpeper's Complete Herbal (1653) states that "It is good for wind and colic in the stomach ... The juice, laid on warm, helps the King's evil or kernels in the throat ... The decoction or distilled water helps a stinking breath, proceeding from corruption of the teeth, and snuffed up the nose, purges the head. It helps the scurf or dandruff of the head used with vinegar."

Additionally, M. longifolia, like other Mentha species, may have medicinal properties.

== See also ==
- Menthol
- Pulegone
