= List of moths of the Iberian Peninsula (G–M) =

Location of the Iberian Peninsula

Iberian moths represent about 4,454 different types of moths. The moths (mostly nocturnal) and butterflies (mostly diurnal) together make up the taxonomic order Lepidoptera.

This is a list of moth species which have been recorded in Portugal, Spain and Gibraltar (together forming the Iberian Peninsula). This list also includes species found on the Balearic Islands.

== Gelechiidae ==
- Acompsia antirrhinella Milliere, 1866
- Acompsia cinerella (Clerck, 1759)
- Acompsia dimorpha Petry, 1904
- Acompsia pyrenaella Huemer & Karsholt, 2002
- Acompsia tripunctella (Denis & Schiffermuller, 1775)
- Acompsia schmidtiellus (Heyden, 1848)
- Altenia scriptella (Hübner, 1796)
- Anacampsis obscurella (Denis & Schiffermuller, 1775)
- Anacampsis populella (Clerck, 1759)
- Anacampsis scintillella (Fischer von Röslerstamm, 1841)
- Anacampsis timidella (Wocke, 1887)
- Anarsia bilbainella (Rossler, 1877)
- Anarsia lineatella Zeller, 1839
- Anarsia spartiella (Schrank, 1802)
- Apatetris agenjoi Gozmany, 1954
- Apodia bifractella (Duponchel, 1843)
- Aponoea obtusipalpis Walsingham, 1905
- Aproaerema anthyllidella (Hübner, 1813)
- Aproaerema lerauti Vives, 2001
- Aristotelia brizella (Treitschke, 1833)
- Aristotelia decoratella (Staudinger, 1879)
- Aristotelia decurtella (Hübner, 1813)
- Aristotelia ericinella (Zeller, 1839)
- Aristotelia frankeniae Walsingham, 1898
- Aristotelia mirabilis (Christoph, 1888)
- Aristotelia montarcella A. Schmidt, 1941
- Aristotelia staticella Milliere, 1876
- Aristotelia subdecurtella (Stainton, 1859)
- Aristotelia subericinella (Duponchel, 1843)
- Aroga aristotelis (Milliere, 1876)
- Aroga flavicomella (Zeller, 1839)
- Aroga pascuicola (Staudinger, 1871)
- Aroga temporariella Sattler, 1960
- Aroga velocella (Duponchel, 1838)
- Athrips amoenella (Frey, 1882)
- Athrips rancidella (Herrich-Schäffer, 1854)
- Athrips thymifoliella (Constant, 1893)
- Brachmia blandella (Fabricius, 1798)
- Brachmia dimidiella (Denis & Schiffermuller, 1775)
- Bryotropha affinis (Haworth, 1828)
- Bryotropha aliterrella (Rebel, 1935)
- Bryotropha arabica Amsel, 1952
- Bryotropha basaltinella (Zeller, 1839)
- Bryotropha desertella (Douglas, 1850)
- Bryotropha domestica (Haworth, 1828)
- Bryotropha dryadella (Zeller, 1850)
- Bryotropha figulella (Staudinger, 1859)
- Bryotropha gallurella Amsel, 1952
- Bryotropha heckfordi Karsholt & Rutten, 2005
- Bryotropha pallorella Amsel, 1952
- Bryotropha plebejella (Zeller, 1847)
- Bryotropha sattleri Nel, 2003
- Bryotropha senectella (Zeller, 1839)
- Bryotropha sutteri Karsholt & Rutten, 2005
- Bryotropha terrella (Denis & Schiffermuller, 1775)
- Bryotropha umbrosella (Zeller, 1839)
- Bryotropha vondermuhlli Nel & Brusseaux, 2003
- Bryotropha wolschrijni Karsholt & Rutten, 2005
- Carpatolechia alburnella (Zeller, 1839)
- Carpatolechia decorella (Haworth, 1812)
- Carpatolechia fugacella (Zeller, 1839)
- Carpatolechia fugitivella (Zeller, 1839)
- Carpatolechia intermediella Huemer & Karsholt, 1999
- Caryocolum alsinella (Zeller, 1868)
- Caryocolum arenbergeri Huemer, 1989
- Caryocolum blandella (Douglas, 1852)
- Caryocolum blandelloides Karsholt, 1981
- Caryocolum blandulella (Tutt, 1887)
- Caryocolum cauligenella (Schmid, 1863)
- Caryocolum fibigerium Huemer, 1988
- Caryocolum fraternella (Douglas, 1851)
- Caryocolum hispanicum Huemer, 1988
- Caryocolum jaspidella (Chretien, 1908)
- Caryocolum leucofasciatum Huemer, 1989
- Caryocolum leucomelanella (Zeller, 1839)
- Caryocolum marmorea (Haworth, 1828)
- Caryocolum mucronatella (Chretien, 1900)
- Caryocolum peregrinella (Herrich-Schäffer, 1854)
- Caryocolum provinciella (Stainton, 1869)
- Caryocolum proxima (Haworth, 1828)
- Caryocolum repentis Huemer & Luquet, 1992
- Caryocolum schleichi (Christoph, 1872)
- Caryocolum tischeriella (Zeller, 1839)
- Caryocolum tricolorella (Haworth, 1812)
- Caryocolum vicinella (Douglas, 1851)
- Caulastrocecis pudicellus (Mann, 1861)
- Chionodes bastuliella (Rebel, 1931)
- Chionodes distinctella (Zeller, 1839)
- Chionodes fumatella (Douglas, 1850)
- Chionodes hinnella (Rebel, 1935)
- Chrysoesthia drurella (Fabricius, 1775)
- Chrysoesthia gaditella (Staudinger, 1859)
- Chrysoesthia sexguttella (Thunberg, 1794)
- Coloptilia conchylidella (O. Hofmann, 1898)
- Cosmardia moritzella (Treitschke, 1835)
- Crossobela trinotella (Herrich-Schäffer, 1856)
- Dactylotula altithermella (Walsingham, 1903)
- Deltophora gielisia Hull, 1995
- Deltophora stictella (Rebel, 1927)
- Dichomeris acuminatus (Staudinger, 1876)
- Dichomeris alacella (Zeller, 1839)
- Dichomeris castellana (A. Schmidt, 1941)
- Dichomeris cisti (Staudinger, 1859)
- Dichomeris helianthemi (Walsingham, 1903)
- Dichomeris juniperella (Linnaeus, 1761)
- Dichomeris lamprostoma (Zeller, 1847)
- Dichomeris limbipunctellus (Staudinger, 1859)
- Dichomeris marginella (Fabricius, 1781)
- Dichomeris rasilella (Herrich-Schäffer, 1854)
- Ephysteris diminutella (Zeller, 1847)
- Ephysteris iberica Povolny, 1977
- Ephysteris inustella (Zeller, 1847)
- Ephysteris promptella (Staudinger, 1859)
- Epidola barcinonella Milliere, 1867
- Epidola stigma Staudinger, 1859
- Eulamprotes atrella (Denis & Schiffermuller, 1775)
- Eulamprotes helotella (Staudinger, 1859)
- Eulamprotes immaculatella (Douglas, 1850)
- Eulamprotes libertinella (Zeller, 1872)
- Eulamprotes nigromaculella (Milliere, 1872)
- Eulamprotes unicolorella (Duponchel, 1843)
- Eulamprotes wilkella (Linnaeus, 1758)
- Exoteleia dodecella (Linnaeus, 1758)
- Filatima spurcella (Duponchel, 1843)
- Filatima textorella (Chretien, 1908)
- Gelechia atlanticella (Amsel, 1955)
- Gelechia mediterranea Huemer, 1991
- Gelechia nervosella (Zerny, 1927)
- Gelechia rhombella (Denis & Schiffermuller, 1775)
- Gelechia sabinellus (Zeller, 1839)
- Gelechia scotinella Herrich-Schäffer, 1854
- Gelechia senticetella (Staudinger, 1859)
- Gelechia sororculella (Hübner, 1817)
- Gelechia turpella (Denis & Schiffermuller, 1775)
- Gladiovalva aizpuruai Vives, 1990
- Gladiovalva badidorsella (Rebel, 1935)
- Gladiovalva rumicivorella (Milliere, 1881)
- Gnorimoschema epithymella (Staudinger, 1859)
- Gnorimoschema herbichii (Nowicki, 1864)
- Gnorimoschema soffneri Riedl, 1965
- Gnorimoschema valesiella (Staudinger, 1877)
- Helcystogramma lutatella (Herrich-Schäffer, 1854)
- Helcystogramma rufescens (Haworth, 1828)
- Helcystogramma triannulella (Herrich-Schäffer, 1854)
- Isophrictis anthemidella (Wocke, 1871)
- Isophrictis cerdanica Nel, 1995
- Isophrictis constantina (Baker, 1888)
- Isophrictis corsicella Amsel, 1936
- Isophrictis impugnata Gozmany, 1957
- Isophrictis kefersteiniellus (Zeller, 1850)
- Isophrictis lineatellus (Zeller, 1850)
- Isophrictis meridionella (Herrich-Schäffer, 1854)
- Isophrictis microlina Meyrick, 1935
- Isophrictis striatella (Denis & Schiffermuller, 1775)
- Istrianis myricariella (Frey, 1870)
- Iwaruna biguttella (Duponchel, 1843)
- Klimeschiopsis terroris (Hartig, 1938)
- Megacraspedus alfacarellus Wehrli, 1926
- Megacraspedus binotella (Duponchel, 1843)
- Megacraspedus cuencellus Caradja, 1920
- Megacraspedus dejectella (Staudinger, 1859)
- Megacraspedus dolosellus (Zeller, 1839)
- Megacraspedus escalerellus A. Schmidt, 1941
- Megacraspedus fallax (Mann, 1867)
- Megacraspedus grossisquammellus Chretien, 1925
- Megacraspedus lanceolellus (Zeller, 1850)
- Megacraspedus pusillus Walsingham, 1903
- Megacraspedus separatellus (Fischer von Röslerstamm, 1843)
- Megacraspedus squalida Meyrick, 1926
- Megacraspedus subdolellus Staudinger, 1859
- Mesophleps corsicella Herrich-Schäffer, 1856
- Mesophleps ochracella (Turati, 1926)
- Mesophleps oxycedrella (Milliere, 1871)
- Mesophleps silacella (Hübner, 1796)
- Metanarsia incertella (Herrich-Schäffer, 1861)
- Metzneria aestivella (Zeller, 1839)
- Metzneria agraphella (Ragonot, 1895)
- Metzneria aprilella (Herrich-Schäffer, 1854)
- Metzneria artificella (Herrich-Schäffer, 1861)
- Metzneria campicolella (Mann, 1857)
- Metzneria castiliella (Moschler, 1866)
- Metzneria diffusella Englert, 1974
- Metzneria ehikeella Gozmany, 1954
- Metzneria expositoi Vives, 2001
- Metzneria hilarella Caradja, 1920
- Metzneria intestinella (Mann, 1864)
- Metzneria lappella (Linnaeus, 1758)
- Metzneria littorella (Douglas, 1850)
- Metzneria metzneriella (Stainton, 1851)
- Metzneria neuropterella (Zeller, 1839)
- Metzneria paucipunctella (Zeller, 1839)
- Metzneria riadella Englert, 1974
- Metzneria santolinella (Amsel, 1936)
- Metzneria staehelinella Englert, 1974
- Metzneria subflavella Englert, 1974
- Metzneria tenuiella (Mann, 1864)
- Metzneria torosulella (Rebel, 1893)
- Metzneria tristella Rebel, 1901
- Microlechia chretieni Turati, 1924
- Mirificarma cabezella (Chretien, 1925)
- Mirificarma cytisella (Treitschke, 1833)
- Mirificarma denotata Pitkin, 1984
- Mirificarma eburnella (Denis & Schiffermuller, 1775)
- Mirificarma fasciata Pitkin, 1984
- Mirificarma flavella (Duponchel, 1844)
- Mirificarma interrupta (Curtis, 1827)
- Mirificarma lentiginosella (Zeller, 1839)
- Mirificarma maculatella (Hübner, 1796)
- Mirificarma mulinella (Zeller, 1839)
- Mirificarma pederskoui Huemer & Karsholt, 1999
- Mirificarma ulicinella (Staudinger, 1859)
- Monochroa cytisella (Curtis, 1837)
- Monochroa hornigi (Staudinger, 1883)
- Monochroa lucidella (Stephens, 1834)
- Monochroa melagonella (Constant, 1895)
- Monochroa moyses Uffen, 1991
- Monochroa nomadella (Zeller, 1868)
- Monochroa rumicetella (O. Hofmann, 1868)
- Monochroa servella (Zeller, 1839)
- Monochroa tenebrella (Hübner, 1817)
- Neofaculta ericetella (Geyer, 1832)
- Neofaculta infernella (Herrich-Schäffer, 1854)
- Neofriseria baungaardiella Huemer & Karsholt, 1999
- Neofriseria peliella (Treitschke, 1835)
- Neofriseria pseudoterrella (Rebel, 1928)
- Neofriseria singula (Staudinger, 1876)
- Neotelphusa cisti (Stainton, 1869)
- Neotelphusa huemeri Nel, 1998
- Neotelphusa sequax (Haworth, 1828)
- Neotelphusa traugotti Huemer & Karsholt, 2001
- Nothris congressariella (Bruand, 1858)
- Nothris verbascella (Denis & Schiffermuller, 1775)
- Ochrodia subdiminutella (Stainton, 1867)
- Ornativalva heluanensis (Debski, 1913)
- Ornativalva plutelliformis (Staudinger, 1859)
- Ornativalva pseudotamaricella Sattler, 1967
- Palumbina guerinii (Stainton, 1858)
- Paranarsia joannisiella Ragonot, 1895
- Parastenolechia nigrinotella (Zeller, 1847)
- Pectinophora gossypiella (Saunders, 1844)
- Pexicopia malvella (Hübner, 1805)
- Phthorimaea operculella (Zeller, 1873)
- Platyedra subcinerea (Haworth, 1828)
- Pogochaetia solitaria Staudinger, 1879
- Prolita sexpunctella (Fabricius, 1794)
- Prolita solutella (Zeller, 1839)
- Pseudosophronia cosmella Constant, 1885
- Pseudosophronia exustellus (Zeller, 1847)
- Pseudotelphusa occidentella Huemer & Karsholt, 1999
- Pseudotelphusa paripunctella (Thunberg, 1794)
- Pseudotelphusa scalella (Scopoli, 1763)
- Pseudotelphusa tessella (Linnaeus, 1758)
- Psoricoptera gibbosella (Zeller, 1839)
- Ptocheuusa abnormella (Herrich-Schäffer, 1854)
- Ptocheuusa asterisci (Walsingham, 1903)
- Ptocheuusa paupella (Zeller, 1847)
- Ptocheuusa scholastica (Walsingham, 1903)
- Pyncostola bohemiella (Nickerl, 1864)
- Recurvaria leucatella (Clerck, 1759)
- Recurvaria nanella (Denis & Schiffermuller, 1775)
- Recurvaria thomeriella (Chretien, 1901)
- Sattleria arcuata Pitkin & Sattler, 1991
- Sattleria pyrenaica (Petry, 1904)
- Schistophila laurocistella Chretien, 1899
- Scrobipalpa acuminatella (Sircom, 1850)
- Scrobipalpa algeriensis Povolny & Bradley, 1964
- Scrobipalpa amseli Povolny, 1966
- Scrobipalpa artemisiella (Treitschke, 1833)
- Scrobipalpa atriplicella (Fischer von Röslerstamm, 1841)
- Scrobipalpa bazae Povolny, 1977
- Scrobipalpa bigoti Povolny, 1973
- Scrobipalpa bradleyi Povolny, 1971
- Scrobipalpa camphorosmella Nel, 1999
- Scrobipalpa corleyi Huemer & Karsholt, 2010
- Scrobipalpa costella (Humphreys & Westwood, 1845)
- Scrobipalpa disjectella (Staudinger, 1859)
- Scrobipalpa divisella (Rebel, 1936)
- Scrobipalpa ergasima (Meyrick, 1916)
- Scrobipalpa gallicella (Constant, 1885)
- Scrobipalpa halymella (Milliere, 1864)
- Scrobipalpa heretica Povolny, 1973
- Scrobipalpa hyoscyamella (Stainton, 1869)
- Scrobipalpa instabilella (Douglas, 1846)
- Scrobipalpa nitentella (Fuchs, 1902)
- Scrobipalpa niveifacies Povolny, 1977
- Scrobipalpa obsoletella (Fischer von Röslerstamm, 1841)
- Scrobipalpa ocellatella (Boyd, 1858)
- Scrobipalpa pauperella (Heinemann, 1870)
- Scrobipalpa phagnalella (Constant, 1895)
- Scrobipalpa portosanctana (Stainton, 1859)
- Scrobipalpa postulatella Huemer & Karsholt, 2010
- Scrobipalpa proclivella (Fuchs, 1886)
- Scrobipalpa salinella (Zeller, 1847)
- Scrobipalpa samadensis (Pfaffenzeller, 1870)
- Scrobipalpa smithi Povolny & Bradley, 1964
- Scrobipalpa stabilis Povolny, 1977
- Scrobipalpa suaedella (Richardson, 1893)
- Scrobipalpa suaedicola (Mabille, 1906)
- Scrobipalpa suaedivorella (Chretien, 1915)
- Scrobipalpa suasella (Constant, 1895)
- Scrobipalpa superstes Povolny, 1977
- Scrobipalpa traganella (Chretien, 1915)
- Scrobipalpa vasconiella (Rossler, 1877)
- Scrobipalpa vicaria (Meyrick, 1921)
- Scrobipalpa voltinella (Chretien, 1898)
- Scrobipalpa wiltshirei Povolny, 1966
- Scrobipalpula psilella (Herrich-Schäffer, 1854)
- Sitotroga cerealella (Olivier, 1789)
- Sophronia chilonella (Treitschke, 1833)
- Sophronia grandii M. Hering, 1933
- Sophronia humerella (Denis & Schiffermuller, 1775)
- Sophronia santolinae Staudinger, 1863
- Sophronia semicostella (Hübner, 1813)
- Sophronia sicariellus (Zeller, 1839)
- Stenolechia gemmella (Linnaeus, 1758)
- Stomopteryx basalis (Staudinger, 1876)
- Stomopteryx detersella (Zeller, 1847)
- Stomopteryx deverrae (Walsingham, 1905)
- Stomopteryx flavipalpella Jackh, 1959
- Stomopteryx flavoclavella Zerny, 1935
- Stomopteryx nugatricella Rebel, 1893
- Stomopteryx remissella (Zeller, 1847)
- Streyella anguinella (Herrich-Schäffer, 1861)
- Syncopacma albipalpella (Herrich-Schäffer, 1854)
- Syncopacma captivella (Herrich-Schäffer, 1854)
- Syncopacma cinctella (Clerck, 1759)
- Syncopacma cincticulella (Bruand, 1851)
- Syncopacma coronillella (Treitschke, 1833)
- Syncopacma larseniella Gozmany, 1957
- Syncopacma patruella (Mann, 1857)
- Syncopacma polychromella (Rebel, 1902)
- Syncopacma sangiella (Stainton, 1863)
- Syncopacma suecicella (Wolff, 1958)
- Syncopacma taeniolella (Zeller, 1839)
- Teleiodes albidorsella Huemer & Karsholt, 1999
- Teleiodes brevivalva Huemer, 1992
- Teleiodes italica Huemer, 1992
- Teleiodes luculella (Hübner, 1813)
- Teleiodes vulgella (Denis & Schiffermuller, 1775)
- Teleiodes wagae (Nowicki, 1860)
- Teleiopsis albifemorella (E. Hofmann, 1867)
- Teleiopsis bagriotella (Duponchel, 1840)
- Teleiopsis diffinis (Haworth, 1828)
- Telphusa cistiflorella (Constant, 1890)
- Thiotricha subocellea (Stephens, 1834)
- Tuta absoluta (Meyrick, 1917)
- Vadenia ribbeella (Caradja, 1920)
- Xenolechia aethiops (Humphreys & Westwood, 1845)

== Geometridae ==
- Abraxas grossulariata (Linnaeus, 1758)
- Abraxas pantaria (Linnaeus, 1767)
- Abraxas sylvata (Scopoli, 1763)
- Acanthovalva inconspicuaria (Hübner, 1819)
- Acasis viretata (Hübner, 1799)
- Adactylotis contaminaria (Hübner, 1813)
- Adactylotis gesticularia (Hübner, 1817)
- Adalbertia castiliaria (Staudinger, 1900)
- Aethalura punctulata (Denis & Schiffermuller, 1775)
- Afriberina tenietaria (Staudinger, 1900)
- Afriberina terraria (A. Bang-Haas, 1907)
- Agriopis aurantiaria (Hübner, 1799)
- Agriopis bajaria (Denis & Schiffermuller, 1775)
- Agriopis leucophaearia (Denis & Schiffermuller, 1775)
- Agriopis marginaria (Fabricius, 1776)
- Alcis jubata (Thunberg, 1788)
- Alcis repandata (Linnaeus, 1758)
- Aleucis distinctata (Herrich-Schäffer, 1839)
- Almeria kalischata (Staudinger, 1870)
- Alsophila aceraria (Denis & Schiffermuller, 1775)
- Alsophila aescularia (Denis & Schiffermuller, 1775)
- Amygdaloptera testaria (Fabricius, 1794)
- Angerona prunaria (Linnaeus, 1758)
- Anthometra plumularia Boisduval, 1840
- Anticlea derivata (Denis & Schiffermuller, 1775)
- Anticollix sparsata (Treitschke, 1828)
- Antilurga alhambrata (Staudinger, 1859)
- Apeira syringaria (Linnaeus, 1758)
- Aplasta ononaria (Fuessly, 1783)
- Aplocera bohatschi (Pungeler, 1914)
- Aplocera efformata (Guenee, 1858)
- Aplocera plagiata (Linnaeus, 1758)
- Aplocera praeformata (Hübner, 1826)
- Aplocera vivesi Exposito Hermosa, 1998
- Apocheima hispidaria (Denis & Schiffermuller, 1775)
- Apochima flabellaria (Heeger, 1838)
- Archiearis parthenias (Linnaeus, 1761)
- Ascotis selenaria (Denis & Schiffermuller, 1775)
- Aspitates gilvaria (Denis & Schiffermuller, 1775)
- Aspitates ochrearia (Rossi, 1794)
- Asthena albulata (Hufnagel, 1767)
- Asthena lacturaria (Herrich-Schäffer, 1855)
- Athroolopha pennigeraria (Hübner, 1813)
- Baptria tibiale (Esper, 1791)
- Biston betularia (Linnaeus, 1758)
- Biston strataria (Hufnagel, 1767)
- Boudinotiana notha (Hübner, 1803)
- Boudinotiana touranginii (Berce, 1870)
- Brachyglossina hispanaria (Pungeler, 1913)
- Bupalus piniaria (Linnaeus, 1758)
- Bustilloxia saturata (A. Bang-Haas, 1906)
- Cabera exanthemata (Scopoli, 1763)
- Cabera pusaria (Linnaeus, 1758)
- Calamodes occitanaria (Duponchel, 1829)
- Campaea honoraria (Denis & Schiffermuller, 1775)
- Campaea margaritaria (Linnaeus, 1761)
- Camptogramma bilineata (Linnaeus, 1758)
- Casilda consecraria (Staudinger, 1871)
- Cataclysme dissimilata (Rambur, 1833)
- Cataclysme riguata (Hübner, 1813)
- Cataclysme uniformata (Bellier, 1862)
- Catarhoe basochesiata (Duponchel, 1831)
- Catarhoe cuculata (Hufnagel, 1767)
- Catarhoe mazeli Viidalepp, 2008
- Catarhoe rubidata (Denis & Schiffermuller, 1775)
- Cepphis advenaria (Hübner, 1790)
- Charissa obscurata (Denis & Schiffermuller, 1775)
- Charissa avilarius (Reisser, 1936)
- Charissa crenulata (Staudinger, 1871)
- Charissa pullata (Denis & Schiffermuller, 1775)
- Charissa assoi (Redondo & Gaston, 1997)
- Charissa mucidaria (Hübner, 1799)
- Charissa variegata (Duponchel, 1830)
- Charissa ambiguata (Duponchel, 1830)
- Charissa predotae (Schawerda, 1929)
- Charissa glaucinaria (Hübner, 1799)
- Chemerina caliginearia (Rambur, 1833)
- Chesias isabella Schawerda, 1915
- Chesias legatella (Denis & Schiffermuller, 1775)
- Chesias rufata (Fabricius, 1775)
- Chiasmia aestimaria (Hübner, 1809)
- Chiasmia clathrata (Linnaeus, 1758)
- Chlorissa cloraria (Hübner, 1813)
- Chlorissa viridata (Linnaeus, 1758)
- Chloroclysta miata (Linnaeus, 1758)
- Chloroclysta siterata (Hufnagel, 1767)
- Chloroclystis v-ata (Haworth, 1809)
- Cidaria fulvata (Forster, 1771)
- Cinglis humifusaria (Eversmann, 1837)
- Cleora cinctaria (Denis & Schiffermuller, 1775)
- Cleorodes lichenaria (Hufnagel, 1767)
- Cleta filacearia (Herrich-Schäffer, 1847)
- Cleta ramosaria (de Villers, 1789)
- Coenocalpe lapidata (Hübner, 1809)
- Coenocalpe millierata (Staudinger, 1901)
- Coenotephria ablutaria (Boisduval, 1840)
- Coenotephria salicata (Denis & Schiffermuller, 1775)
- Coenotephria tophaceata (Denis & Schiffermuller, 1775)
- Colostygia aptata (Hübner, 1813)
- Colostygia aqueata (Hübner, 1813)
- Colostygia hilariata (Pinker, 1954)
- Colostygia multistrigaria (Haworth, 1809)
- Colostygia olivata (Denis & Schiffermuller, 1775)
- Colostygia pectinataria (Knoch, 1781)
- Colostygia turbata (Hübner, 1799)
- Colotois pennaria (Linnaeus, 1761)
- Comibaena bajularia (Denis & Schiffermuller, 1775)
- Comibaena pseudoneriaria Wehrli, 1926
- Compsoptera caesaraugustanus Redondo, 1995
- Compsoptera jourdanaria (Serres, 1826)
- Compsoptera opacaria (Hübner, 1819)
- Cosmorhoe ocellata (Linnaeus, 1758)
- Costaconvexa polygrammata (Borkhausen, 1794)
- Crocallis albarracina Wehrli, 1940
- Crocallis auberti Oberthur, 1883
- Crocallis dardoinaria Donzel, 1840
- Crocallis elinguaria (Linnaeus, 1758)
- Crocallis tusciaria (Borkhausen, 1793)
- Crocota peletieraria (Duponchel, 1830)
- Cyclophora hyponoea (Prout, 1935)
- Cyclophora linearia (Hübner, 1799)
- Cyclophora porata (Linnaeus, 1767)
- Cyclophora punctaria (Linnaeus, 1758)
- Cyclophora suppunctaria (Zeller, 1847)
- Cyclophora albiocellaria (Hübner, 1789)
- Cyclophora albipunctata (Hufnagel, 1767)
- Cyclophora annularia (Fabricius, 1775)
- Cyclophora pendularia (Clerck, 1759)
- Cyclophora puppillaria (Hübner, 1799)
- Cyclophora quercimontaria (Bastelberger, 1897)
- Cyclophora ruficiliaria (Herrich-Schäffer, 1855)
- Cyclophora serveti Redondo & Gaston, 1999
- Dasypteroma thaumasia Staudinger, 1892
- Deileptenia ribeata (Clerck, 1759)
- Digrammia rippertaria (Duponchel, 1830)
- Dyscia fagaria (Thunberg, 1784)
- Dyscia penulataria (Hübner, 1819)
- Dyscia distinctaria (A. Bang-Haas, 1910)
- Dyscia lentiscaria (Donzel, 1837)
- Dysstroma citrata (Linnaeus, 1761)
- Dysstroma truncata (Hufnagel, 1767)
- Earophila badiata (Denis & Schiffermuller, 1775)
- Ecleora solieraria (Rambur, 1834)
- Ecliptopera capitata (Herrich-Schäffer, 1839)
- Ecliptopera silaceata (Denis & Schiffermuller, 1775)
- Ectropis crepuscularia (Denis & Schiffermuller, 1775)
- Ekboarmia atlanticaria (Staudinger, 1859)
- Ekboarmia fascinataria (Staudinger, 1900)
- Ekboarmia sagnesi Dufay, 1979
- Electrophaes corylata (Thunberg, 1792)
- Elophos caelibaria (Heydenreich, 1851)
- Elophos unicoloraria (Staudinger, 1871)
- Elophos dilucidaria (Denis & Schiffermuller, 1775)
- Elophos dognini (Thierry-Mieg, 1910)
- Ematurga atomaria (Linnaeus, 1758)
- Ennomos alniaria (Linnaeus, 1758)
- Ennomos autumnaria (Werneburg, 1859)
- Ennomos erosaria (Denis & Schiffermuller, 1775)
- Ennomos fuscantaria (Haworth, 1809)
- Ennomos quercaria (Hübner, 1813)
- Ennomos quercinaria (Hufnagel, 1767)
- Entephria caeruleata (Guenee, 1858)
- Entephria caesiata (Denis & Schiffermuller, 1775)
- Entephria cyanata (Hübner, 1809)
- Entephria flavicinctata (Hübner, 1813)
- Entephria nobiliaria (Herrich-Schäffer, 1852)
- Epilobophora sabinata (Geyer, 1831)
- Epione repandaria (Hufnagel, 1767)
- Epione vespertaria (Linnaeus, 1767)
- Epirrhoe alternata (Muller, 1764)
- Epirrhoe galiata (Denis & Schiffermuller, 1775)
- Epirrhoe molluginata (Hübner, 1813)
- Epirrhoe rivata (Hübner, 1813)
- Epirrhoe sandosaria (Herrich-Schäffer, 1852)
- Epirrhoe tristata (Linnaeus, 1758)
- Epirrita autumnata (Borkhausen, 1794)
- Epirrita christyi (Allen, 1906)
- Epirrita dilutata (Denis & Schiffermuller, 1775)
- Erannis defoliaria (Clerck, 1759)
- Euchoeca nebulata (Scopoli, 1763)
- Eucrostes indigenata (de Villers, 1789)
- Eulithis mellinata (Fabricius, 1787)
- Eulithis populata (Linnaeus, 1758)
- Eulithis prunata (Linnaeus, 1758)
- Eulithis testata (Linnaeus, 1761)
- Euphyia biangulata (Haworth, 1809)
- Euphyia frustata (Treitschke, 1828)
- Euphyia unangulata (Haworth, 1809)
- Eupithecia abbreviata Stephens, 1831
- Eupithecia absinthiata (Clerck, 1759)
- Eupithecia alliaria Staudinger, 1870
- Eupithecia assimilata Doubleday, 1856
- Eupithecia breviculata (Donzel, 1837)
- Eupithecia carpophagata Staudinger, 1871
- Eupithecia cauchiata (Duponchel, 1831)
- Eupithecia centaureata (Denis & Schiffermuller, 1775)
- Eupithecia chalikophila Wehrli, 1926
- Eupithecia cocciferata Milliere, 1864
- Eupithecia cooptata Dietze, 1903
- Eupithecia denotata (Hübner, 1813)
- Eupithecia distinctaria Herrich-Schäffer, 1848
- Eupithecia dodoneata Guenee, 1858
- Eupithecia druentiata Dietze, 1902
- Eupithecia egenaria Herrich-Schäffer, 1848
- Eupithecia ericeata (Rambur, 1833)
- Eupithecia extensaria (Freyer, 1844)
- Eupithecia extraversaria Herrich-Schäffer, 1852
- Eupithecia extremata (Fabricius, 1787)
- Eupithecia gemellata Herrich-Schäffer, 1861
- Eupithecia graphata (Treitschke, 1828)
- Eupithecia gratiosata Herrich-Schäffer, 1861
- Eupithecia gueneata Milliere, 1862
- Eupithecia haworthiata Doubleday, 1856
- Eupithecia icterata (de Villers, 1789)
- Eupithecia immundata (Lienig, 1846)
- Eupithecia impurata (Hübner, 1813)
- Eupithecia indigata (Hübner, 1813)
- Eupithecia innotata (Hufnagel, 1767)
- Eupithecia intricata (Zetterstedt, 1839)
- Eupithecia inturbata (Hübner, 1817)
- Eupithecia irriguata (Hübner, 1813)
- Eupithecia laquaearia Herrich-Schäffer, 1848
- Eupithecia lariciata (Freyer, 1841)
- Eupithecia liguriata Milliere, 1884
- Eupithecia limbata Staudinger, 1879
- Eupithecia linariata (Denis & Schiffermuller, 1775)
- Eupithecia massiliata Milliere, 1865
- Eupithecia millefoliata Rossler, 1866
- Eupithecia minusculata Alphéraky, 1882
- Eupithecia nanata (Hübner, 1813)
- Eupithecia ochridata Schutze & Pinker, 1968
- Eupithecia orana Dietze, 1913
- Eupithecia orphnata W. Petersen, 1909
- Eupithecia oxycedrata (Rambur, 1833)
- Eupithecia pantellata Milliere, 1875
- Eupithecia pauxillaria Boisduval, 1840
- Eupithecia phoeniceata (Rambur, 1834)
- Eupithecia pimpinellata (Hübner, 1813)
- Eupithecia plumbeolata (Haworth, 1809)
- Eupithecia praealta Wehrli, 1926
- Eupithecia pulchellata Stephens, 1831
- Eupithecia pusillata (Denis & Schiffermuller, 1775)
- Eupithecia pyreneata Mabille, 1871
- Eupithecia rosmarinata Dardoin & Milliere, 1865
- Eupithecia santolinata Mabille, 1871
- Eupithecia satyrata (Hübner, 1813)
- Eupithecia schiefereri Bohatsch, 1893
- Eupithecia scopariata (Rambur, 1833)
- Eupithecia selinata Herrich-Schäffer, 1861
- Eupithecia semigraphata Bruand, 1850
- Eupithecia senorita Mironov, 2003
- Eupithecia silenata Assmann, 1848
- Eupithecia simpliciata (Haworth, 1809)
- Eupithecia subfuscata (Haworth, 1809)
- Eupithecia subumbrata (Denis & Schiffermuller, 1775)
- Eupithecia succenturiata (Linnaeus, 1758)
- Eupithecia tantillaria Boisduval, 1840
- Eupithecia tenuiata (Hübner, 1813)
- Eupithecia tripunctaria Herrich-Schäffer, 1852
- Eupithecia trisignaria Herrich-Schäffer, 1848
- Eupithecia ultimaria Boisduval, 1840
- Eupithecia undata (Freyer, 1840)
- Eupithecia unedonata Mabille, 1868
- Eupithecia unitaria Herrich-Schäffer, 1852
- Eupithecia variostrigata Alphéraky, 1876
- Eupithecia venosata (Fabricius, 1787)
- Eupithecia veratraria Herrich-Schäffer, 1848
- Eupithecia virgaureata Doubleday, 1861
- Eupithecia vulgata (Haworth, 1809)
- Eupithecia weissi Prout, 1938
- Eurranthis plummistaria (de Villers, 1789)
- Eustroma reticulata (Denis & Schiffermuller, 1775)
- Gagitodes sagittata (Fabricius, 1787)
- Gandaritis pyraliata (Denis & Schiffermuller, 1775)
- Geometra papilionaria (Linnaeus, 1758)
- Glacies bentelii (Ratzer, 1890)
- Glacies canaliculata (Hochenwarth, 1785)
- Glacies coracina (Esper, 1805)
- Gnopharmia stevenaria (Boisduval, 1840)
- Gnophos furvata (Denis & Schiffermuller, 1775)
- Gnophos obfuscata (Denis & Schiffermuller, 1775)
- Gnophos dumetata Treitschke, 1827
- Gnophos perspersata Treitschke, 1827
- Gymnoscelis rufifasciata (Haworth, 1809)
- Heliothea discoidaria Boisduval, 1840
- Hemistola chrysoprasaria (Esper, 1795)
- Hemithea aestivaria (Hübner, 1789)
- Horisme aemulata (Hübner, 1813)
- Horisme aquata (Hübner, 1813)
- Horisme calligraphata (Herrich-Schäffer, 1838)
- Horisme radicaria (de La Harpe, 1855)
- Horisme scorteata (Staudinger, 1901)
- Horisme tersata (Denis & Schiffermuller, 1775)
- Horisme vitalbata (Denis & Schiffermuller, 1775)
- Hospitalia flavolineata (Staudinger, 1883)
- Hydrelia flammeolaria (Hufnagel, 1767)
- Hydrelia sylvata (Denis & Schiffermuller, 1775)
- Hydria andalusica (Ribbe, 1912)
- Hydria cervinalis (Scopoli, 1763)
- Hydria gudarica (Dufay, 1983)
- Hydria ithys (Prout, 1937)
- Hydria montivagata (Duponchel, 1830)
- Hydria undulata (Linnaeus, 1758)
- Hydriomena furcata (Thunberg, 1784)
- Hydriomena impluviata (Denis & Schiffermuller, 1775)
- Hydriomena ruberata (Freyer, 1831)
- Hylaea fasciaria (Linnaeus, 1758)
- Hypomecis punctinalis (Scopoli, 1763)
- Hypomecis roboraria (Denis & Schiffermuller, 1775)
- Idaea acutipennis Hausmann & Honey, 2004
- Idaea albarracina (Reisser, 1934)
- Idaea alicantaria (Reisser, 1963)
- Idaea alyssumata (Milliere, 1871)
- Idaea attenuaria (Rambur, 1833)
- Idaea aureolaria (Denis & Schiffermuller, 1775)
- Idaea aversata (Linnaeus, 1758)
- Idaea belemiata (Milliere, 1868)
- Idaea bigladiata Herbulot, 1975
- Idaea biselata (Hufnagel, 1767)
- Idaea blaesii Lenz & Hausmann, 1992
- Idaea calunetaria (Staudinger, 1859)
- Idaea camparia (Herrich-Schäffer, 1852)
- Idaea carvalhoi Herbulot, 1979
- Idaea cervantaria (Milliere, 1869)
- Idaea circuitaria (Hübner, 1819)
- Idaea completa (Staudinger, 1892)
- Idaea consanguiberica Rezbanyai-Reser & Exposito, 1992
- Idaea contiguaria (Hübner, 1799)
- Idaea davidi Gaston & Redondo, 2005
- Idaea degeneraria (Hübner, 1799)
- Idaea deitanaria Reisser & Weisert, 1977
- Idaea deversaria (Herrich-Schäffer, 1847)
- Idaea dilutaria (Hübner, 1799)
- Idaea dimidiata (Hufnagel, 1767)
- Idaea distinctaria (Boisduval, 1840)
- Idaea dromikos Hausmann, 2004
- Idaea efflorata Zeller, 1849
- Idaea elongaria (Rambur, 1833)
- Idaea emarginata (Linnaeus, 1758)
- Idaea eugeniata (Dardoin & Milliere, 1870)
- Idaea exilaria (Guenee, 1858)
- Idaea figuraria (Bang-Haas, 1907)
- Idaea filicata (Hübner, 1799)
- Idaea flaveolaria (Hübner, 1809)
- Idaea fractilineata (Zeller, 1847)
- Idaea fuscovenosa (Goeze, 1781)
- Idaea humiliata (Hufnagel, 1767)
- Idaea ibizaria von Mentzer, 1980
- Idaea incalcarata (Chretien, 1913)
- Idaea incisaria (Staudinger, 1892)
- Idaea infirmaria (Rambur, 1833)
- Idaea inquinata (Scopoli, 1763)
- Idaea joannisiata (Homberg, 1911)
- Idaea korbi (Pungeler, 1917)
- Idaea laevigata (Scopoli, 1763)
- Idaea lambessata (Oberthur, 1887)
- Idaea litigiosaria (Boisduval, 1840)
- Idaea longaria (Herrich-Schäffer, 1852)
- Idaea lusohispanica Herbulot, 1991
- Idaea luteolaria (Constant, 1863)
- Idaea lutulentaria (Staudinger, 1892)
- Idaea macilentaria (Herrich-Schäffer, 1847)
- Idaea mancipiata (Staudinger, 1871)
- Idaea manicaria (Herrich-Schäffer, 1852)
- Idaea mediaria (Hübner, 1819)
- Idaea minuscularia (Ribbe, 1912)
- Idaea moniliata (Denis & Schiffermuller, 1775)
- Idaea muricata (Hufnagel, 1767)
- Idaea mustelata (Gumppenberg, 1892)
- Idaea nevadata (Wehrli, 1926)
- Idaea nexata (Hübner, 1813)
- Idaea nigrolineata (Chretien, 1911)
- Idaea obsoletaria (Rambur, 1833)
- Idaea ochrata (Scopoli, 1763)
- Idaea ostrinaria (Hübner, 1813)
- Idaea politaria (Hübner, 1799)
- Idaea praecisa (Reisser, 1934)
- Idaea predotaria (Hartig, 1951)
- Idaea rainerii Hausmann, 1994
- Idaea rhodogrammaria (Pungeler, 1913)
- Idaea robiginata (Staudinger, 1863)
- Idaea rubraria (Staudinger, 1901)
- Idaea rufaria (Hübner, 1799)
- Idaea rupicolaria (Reisser, 1927)
- Idaea rusticata (Denis & Schiffermuller, 1775)
- Idaea saleri Dominguez & Baixeras, 1992
- Idaea sardoniata (Homberg, 1912)
- Idaea seriata (Schrank, 1802)
- Idaea sericeata (Hübner, 1813)
- Idaea serpentata (Hufnagel, 1767)
- Idaea simplicior (Prout, 1934)
- Idaea squalidaria (Staudinger, 1882)
- Idaea straminata (Borkhausen, 1794)
- Idaea subsaturata (Guenee, 1858)
- Idaea subsericeata (Haworth, 1809)
- Idaea sylvestraria (Hübner, 1799)
- Idaea trigeminata (Haworth, 1809)
- Idaea urcitana (Agenjo, 1952)
- Isturgia catalaunaria (Guenee, 1858)
- Isturgia famula (Esper, 1787)
- Isturgia limbaria (Fabricius, 1775)
- Isturgia miniosaria (Duponchel, 1829)
- Isturgia murinaria (Denis & Schiffermuller, 1775)
- Isturgia pulinda (Walker, 1860)
- Isturgia spodiaria (Lefebvre, 1832)
- Itame vincularia (Hübner, 1813)
- Jodis lactearia (Linnaeus, 1758)
- Kuchleria insignata Hausmann, 1994
- Lampropteryx otregiata (Metcalfe, 1917)
- Lampropteryx suffumata (Denis & Schiffermuller, 1775)
- Larentia clavaria (Haworth, 1809)
- Larentia malvata (Rambur, 1833)
- Ligdia adustata (Denis & Schiffermuller, 1775)
- Lithostege castiliaria Staudinger, 1877
- Lithostege cinerata Turati, 1924
- Lithostege clarae Gaston & Redondo, 2004
- Lithostege duponcheli Prout, 1938
- Lithostege griseata (Denis & Schiffermuller, 1775)
- Lobophora halterata (Hufnagel, 1767)
- Lomaspilis marginata (Linnaeus, 1758)
- Lomographa bimaculata (Fabricius, 1775)
- Lomographa temerata (Denis & Schiffermuller, 1775)
- Lycia hirtaria (Clerck, 1759)
- Lycia zonaria (Denis & Schiffermuller, 1775)
- Lythria purpuraria (Linnaeus, 1758)
- Lythria sanguinaria (Duponchel, 1842)
- Macaria alternata (Denis & Schiffermuller, 1775)
- Macaria artesiaria (Denis & Schiffermuller, 1775)
- Macaria brunneata (Thunberg, 1784)
- Macaria liturata (Clerck, 1759)
- Macaria notata (Linnaeus, 1758)
- Macaria wauaria (Linnaeus, 1758)
- Melanthia procellata (Denis & Schiffermuller, 1775)
- Menophra abruptaria (Thunberg, 1792)
- Menophra annegreteae Skou, 2007
- Menophra harterti (Rothschild, 1912)
- Menophra japygiaria (O. Costa, 1849)
- Menophra nycthemeraria (Geyer, 1831)
- Mesoleuca albicillata (Linnaeus, 1758)
- Mesotype didymata (Linnaeus, 1758)
- Mesotype verberata (Scopoli, 1763)
- Microloxia herbaria (Hübner, 1813)
- Minoa murinata (Scopoli, 1763)
- Myinodes constantina Hausmann, 1994
- Myinodes interpunctaria (Herrich-Schäffer, 1839)
- Narraga isabel Agenjo, 1956
- Narraga nelvae (Rothschild, 1912)
- Nebula achromaria (de La Harpe, 1853)
- Nebula ibericata (Staudinger, 1871)
- Nebula nebulata (Treitschke, 1828)
- Nebula numidiata (Staudinger, 1892)
- Nychiodes andalusiaria Staudinger, 1892
- Nychiodes hispanica Wehrli, 1929
- Nychiodes notarioi Exposito Hermosa, 2005
- Nycterosea obstipata (Fabricius, 1794)
- Oar reaumuraria (Milliere, 1864)
- Odezia atrata (Linnaeus, 1758)
- Odontopera bidentata (Clerck, 1759)
- Onychora agaritharia (Dardoin, 1842)
- Operophtera brumata (Linnaeus, 1758)
- Operophtera fagata (Scharfenberg, 1805)
- Opisthograptis luteolata (Linnaeus, 1758)
- Oulobophora internata (Pungeler, 1888)
- Ourapteryx sambucaria (Linnaeus, 1758)
- Pachycnemia hippocastanaria (Hübner, 1799)
- Pachycnemia tibiaria (Rambur, 1829)
- Paradarisa consonaria (Hübner, 1799)
- Parectropis similaria (Hufnagel, 1767)
- Pareulype berberata (Denis & Schiffermuller, 1775)
- Pareulype lasithiotica (Rebel, 1906)
- Pasiphila debiliata (Hübner, 1817)
- Pasiphila rectangulata (Linnaeus, 1758)
- Pelurga comitata (Linnaeus, 1758)
- Pennithera firmata (Hübner, 1822)
- Pennithera ulicata (Rambur, 1934)
- Perconia baeticaria (Staudinger, 1871)
- Perconia strigillaria (Hübner, 1787)
- Peribatodes abstersaria (Boisduval, 1840)
- Peribatodes ilicaria (Geyer, 1833)
- Peribatodes perversaria (Boisduval, 1840)
- Peribatodes powelli (Oberthur, 1913)
- Peribatodes rhomboidaria (Denis & Schiffermuller, 1775)
- Peribatodes secundaria (Denis & Schiffermuller, 1775)
- Peribatodes subflavaria (Milliere, 1876)
- Peribatodes umbraria (Hübner, 1809)
- Perizoma affinitata (Stephens, 1831)
- Perizoma albulata (Denis & Schiffermuller, 1775)
- Perizoma alchemillata (Linnaeus, 1758)
- Perizoma bifaciata (Haworth, 1809)
- Perizoma blandiata (Denis & Schiffermuller, 1775)
- Perizoma flavofasciata (Thunberg, 1792)
- Perizoma flavosparsata (Wagner, 1926)
- Perizoma hydrata (Treitschke, 1829)
- Perizoma incultaria (Herrich-Schäffer, 1848)
- Perizoma lugdunaria (Herrich-Schäffer, 1855)
- Perizoma minorata (Treitschke, 1828)
- Perizoma obsoletata (Herrich-Schäffer, 1838)
- Petrophora binaevata (Mabille, 1869)
- Petrophora chlorosata (Scopoli, 1763)
- Petrophora convergata (de Villers, 1789)
- Petrophora narbonea (Linnaeus, 1767)
- Phaiogramma etruscaria (Zeller, 1849)
- Phaiogramma faustinata (Milliere, 1868)
- Phaselia algiricaria Oberthur, 1913
- Phibalapteryx virgata (Hufnagel, 1767)
- Phigalia pilosaria (Denis & Schiffermuller, 1775)
- Philereme transversata (Hufnagel, 1767)
- Philereme vetulata (Denis & Schiffermuller, 1775)
- Pingasa lahayei (Oberthur, 1887)
- Plagodis dolabraria (Linnaeus, 1767)
- Plagodis pulveraria (Linnaeus, 1758)
- Plemyria rubiginata (Denis & Schiffermuller, 1775)
- Protorhoe corollaria (Herrich-Schäffer, 1848)
- Pseudopanthera macularia (Linnaeus, 1758)
- Pseudoterpna coronillaria (Hübner, 1817)
- Pseudoterpna pruinata (Hufnagel, 1767)
- Psodos quadrifaria (Sulzer, 1776)
- Pterapherapteryx sexalata (Retzius, 1783)
- Pungeleria capreolaria (Denis & Schiffermuller, 1775)
- Rheumaptera hastata (Linnaeus, 1758)
- Rhodometra sacraria (Linnaeus, 1767)
- Rhodostrophia calabra (Petagna, 1786)
- Rhodostrophia pudorata (Fabricius, 1794)
- Rhodostrophia vibicaria (Clerck, 1759)
- Rhoptria asperaria (Hübner, 1817)
- Sardocyrnia fortunaria (Vazquez, 1905)
- Sciadia tenebraria (Esper, 1806)
- Scopula asellaria (Herrich-Schäffer, 1847)
- Scopula confinaria (Herrich-Schäffer, 1847)
- Scopula decolor (Staudinger, 1898)
- Scopula emutaria (Hübner, 1809)
- Scopula floslactata (Haworth, 1809)
- Scopula imitaria (Hübner, 1799)
- Scopula immutata (Linnaeus, 1758)
- Scopula incanata (Linnaeus, 1758)
- Scopula marginepunctata (Goeze, 1781)
- Scopula minorata (Boisduval, 1833)
- Scopula rubellata (Gumppenberg, 1892)
- Scopula rufomixtaria (de Graslin, 1863)
- Scopula subpunctaria (Herrich-Schäffer, 1847)
- Scopula ternata Schrank, 1802
- Scopula caricaria (Reutti, 1853)
- Scopula concinnaria (Duponchel, 1842)
- Scopula decorata (Denis & Schiffermuller, 1775)
- Scopula immorata (Linnaeus, 1758)
- Scopula nigropunctata (Hufnagel, 1767)
- Scopula ornata (Scopoli, 1763)
- Scopula rubiginata (Hufnagel, 1767)
- Scopula submutata (Treitschke, 1828)
- Scopula tessellaria (Boisduval, 1840)
- Scopula turbidaria (Hübner, 1819)
- Scopula virgulata (Denis & Schiffermuller, 1775)
- Scotopteryx alfacaria (Staudinger, 1859)
- Scotopteryx angularia (de Villers, 1789)
- Scotopteryx bipunctaria (Denis & Schiffermuller, 1775)
- Scotopteryx chenopodiata (Linnaeus, 1758)
- Scotopteryx coarctaria (Denis & Schiffermuller, 1775)
- Scotopteryx coelinaria (de Graslin, 1863)
- Scotopteryx luridata (Hufnagel, 1767)
- Scotopteryx moeniata (Scopoli, 1763)
- Scotopteryx mucronata (Scopoli, 1763)
- Scotopteryx octodurensis (Favre, 1903)
- Scotopteryx peribolata (Hübner, 1817)
- Selenia dentaria (Fabricius, 1775)
- Selenia lunularia (Hübner, 1788)
- Selenia tetralunaria (Hufnagel, 1767)
- Selidosema brunnearia (de Villers, 1789)
- Selidosema plumaria (Denis & Schiffermuller, 1775)
- Selidosema taeniolaria (Hübner, 1813)
- Siona lineata (Scopoli, 1763)
- Spargania luctuata (Denis & Schiffermuller, 1775)
- Stegania cararia (Hübner, 1790)
- Stegania trimaculata (de Villers, 1789)
- Synopsia sociaria (Hübner, 1799)
- Tephronia codetaria (Oberthur, 1881)
- Tephronia espaniola (Schawerda, 1931)
- Tephronia gracilaria (Boisduval, 1840)
- Tephronia oranaria Staudinger, 1892
- Tephronia sepiaria (Hufnagel, 1767)
- Thalera fimbrialis (Scopoli, 1763)
- Thera britannica (Turner, 1925)
- Thera cognata (Thunberg, 1792)
- Thera cupressata (Geyer, 1831)
- Thera juniperata (Linnaeus, 1758)
- Thera obeliscata (Hübner, 1787)
- Thera variata (Denis & Schiffermuller, 1775)
- Thera vetustata (Denis & Schiffermuller, 1775)
- Theria primaria (Haworth, 1809)
- Thetidia smaragdaria (Fabricius, 1787)
- Thetidia plusiaria Boisduval, 1840
- Timandra comae Schmidt, 1931
- Timandra griseata Petersen, 1902
- Toulgoetia cauteriata (Staudinger, 1859)
- Trichopteryx carpinata (Borkhausen, 1794)
- Trichopteryx polycommata (Denis & Schiffermuller, 1775)
- Triphosa dubitata (Linnaeus, 1758)
- Triphosa sabaudiata (Duponchel, 1830)
- Triphosa tauteli Leraut, 2008
- Venusia cambrica Curtis, 1839
- Xanthorhoe biriviata (Borkhausen, 1794)
- Xanthorhoe decoloraria (Esper, 1806)
- Xanthorhoe designata (Hufnagel, 1767)
- Xanthorhoe disjunctaria (de La Harpe, 1860)
- Xanthorhoe ferrugata (Clerck, 1759)
- Xanthorhoe fluctuata (Linnaeus, 1758)
- Xanthorhoe montanata (Denis & Schiffermuller, 1775)
- Xanthorhoe quadrifasiata (Clerck, 1759)
- Xanthorhoe skoui Viidalepp & Hausmann, 2004
- Xanthorhoe spadicearia (Denis & Schiffermuller, 1775)
- Xenochlorodes olympiaria (Herrich-Schäffer, 1852)
- Zernyia granataria (Staudinger, 1871)

== Glyphipterigidae ==
- Acrolepia autumnitella Curtis, 1838
- Acrolepiopsis assectella (Zeller, 1839)
- Acrolepiopsis marcidella (Curtis, 1850)
- Acrolepiopsis vesperella (Zeller, 1850)
- Digitivalva eglanteriella (Mann, 1855)
- Digitivalva pappella (Walsingham, 1908)
- Digitivalva reticulella (Hübner, 1796)
- Digitivalva granitella (Treitschke, 1833)
- Digitivalva occidentella (Klimesch, 1956)
- Digitivalva pulicariae (Klimesch, 1956)
- Digitivalva solidaginis (Staudinger, 1859)
- Glyphipterix bergstraesserella (Fabricius, 1781)
- Glyphipterix equitella (Scopoli, 1763)
- Glyphipterix forsterella (Fabricius, 1781)
- Glyphipterix fuscoviridella (Haworth, 1828)
- Glyphipterix gianelliella Ragonot, 1885
- Glyphipterix haworthana (Stephens, 1834)
- Glyphipterix schoenicolella Boyd, 1859
- Glyphipterix simpliciella (Stephens, 1834)
- Glyphipterix thrasonella (Scopoli, 1763)
- Glyphipterix umbilici M. Hering, 1927
- Orthotelia sparganella (Thunberg, 1788)

== Gracillariidae ==
- Acrocercops brongniardella (Fabricius, 1798)
- Acrocercops cocciferellum (Chretien, 1910)
- Aspilapteryx limosella (Duponchel, 1843)
- Aspilapteryx multipunctella Chretien, 1916
- Aspilapteryx tringipennella (Zeller, 1839)
- Callisto denticulella (Thunberg, 1794)
- Caloptilia alchimiella (Scopoli, 1763)
- Caloptilia azaleella (Brants, 1913)
- Caloptilia coruscans (Walsingham, 1907)
- Caloptilia cuculipennella (Hübner, 1796)
- Caloptilia elongella (Linnaeus, 1761)
- Caloptilia falconipennella (Hübner, 1813)
- Caloptilia fidella (Reutti, 1853)
- Caloptilia fribergensis (Fritzsche, 1871)
- Caloptilia hemidactylella (Denis & Schiffermuller, 1775)
- Caloptilia populetorum (Zeller, 1839)
- Caloptilia robustella Jackh, 1972
- Caloptilia roscipennella (Hübner, 1796)
- Caloptilia rufipennella (Hübner, 1796)
- Caloptilia stigmatella (Fabricius, 1781)
- Calybites phasianipennella (Hübner, 1813)
- Cameraria ohridella Deschka & Dimic, 1986
- Dextellia dorsilineella (Amsel, 1935)
- Dialectica scalariella (Zeller, 1850)
- Euspilapteryx auroguttella Stephens, 1835
- Gracillaria syringella (Fabricius, 1794)
- Leucospilapteryx omissella (Stainton, 1848)
- Metriochroa latifoliella (Milliere, 1886)
- Micrurapteryx gradatella (Herrich-Schäffer, 1855)
- Micrurapteryx kollariella (Zeller, 1839)
- Parectopa ononidis (Zeller, 1839)
- Parornix anglicella (Stainton, 1850)
- Parornix incerta Triberti, 1982
- Parornix scoticella (Stainton, 1850)
- Parornix szocsi Gozmany, 1952
- Parornix tenella (Rebel, 1919)
- Parornix torquillella (Zeller, 1850)
- Phyllocnistis citrella Stainton, 1856
- Phyllocnistis labyrinthella (Bjerkander, 1790)
- Phyllocnistis ramulicola Langmaid & Corley, 2007
- Phyllocnistis saligna (Zeller, 1839)
- Phyllocnistis unipunctella (Stephens, 1834)
- Phyllocnistis valentinensis M. Hering, 1936
- Phyllocnistis xenia M. Hering, 1936
- Phyllonorycter adenocarpi (Staudinger, 1863)
- Phyllonorycter alnivorella (Ragonot, 1875)
- Phyllonorycter andalusicus A. & Z. Lastuvka, 2006
- Phyllonorycter aroniae (M. Hering, 1936)
- Phyllonorycter baetica A. & Z. Lastuvka, 2006
- Phyllonorycter barbarella (Rebel, 1901)
- Phyllonorycter belotella (Staudinger, 1859)
- Phyllonorycter blancardella (Fabricius, 1781)
- Phyllonorycter cerasicolella (Herrich-Schäffer, 1855)
- Phyllonorycter cerasinella (Reutti, 1852)
- Phyllonorycter chiclanella (Staudinger, 1859)
- Phyllonorycter chrysella (Constant, 1885)
- Phyllonorycter cocciferella (Mendes, 1910)
- Phyllonorycter comparella (Duponchel, 1843)
- Phyllonorycter coryli (Nicelli, 1851)
- Phyllonorycter corylifoliella (Hübner, 1796)
- Phyllonorycter delitella (Duponchel, 1843)
- Phyllonorycter deschkanus A. & Z. Lastuvka, 2006
- Phyllonorycter distentella (Zeller, 1846)
- Phyllonorycter echinosparti A. & Z. Lastuvka, 2006
- Phyllonorycter endryella (Mann, 1855)
- Phyllonorycter erinaceae Lastuvka & Lastuvka, 2013
- Phyllonorycter estrela A. & Z. Lastuvka, 2006
- Phyllonorycter froelichiella (Zeller, 1839)
- Phyllonorycter genistella (Rebel, 1900)
- Phyllonorycter haasi (Rebel, 1901)
- Phyllonorycter harrisella (Linnaeus, 1761)
- Phyllonorycter helianthemella (Herrich-Schäffer, 1861)
- Phyllonorycter hesperiella (Staudinger, 1859)
- Phyllonorycter hilarella (Zetterstedt, 1839)
- Phyllonorycter ilicifoliella (Duponchel, 1843)
- Phyllonorycter insignitella (Zeller, 1846)
- Phyllonorycter kautziella (Hartig, 1938)
- Phyllonorycter klemannella (Fabricius, 1781)
- Phyllonorycter kuhlweiniella (Zeller, 1839)
- Phyllonorycter kusdasi Deschka, 1970
- Phyllonorycter lantanella (Schrank, 1802)
- Phyllonorycter lautella (Zeller, 1846)
- Phyllonorycter maestingella (Muller, 1764)
- Phyllonorycter mespilella (Hübner, 1805)
- Phyllonorycter messaniella (Zeller, 1846)
- Phyllonorycter millierella (Staudinger, 1871)
- Phyllonorycter monspessulanella (Fuchs, 1897)
- Phyllonorycter nevadensis Walsingham, 1908
- Phyllonorycter nicellii (Stainton, 1851)
- Phyllonorycter nigrescentella (Logan, 1851)
- Phyllonorycter oxyacanthae (Frey, 1856)
- Phyllonorycter parvifoliella (Ragonot, 1875)
- Phyllonorycter pastorella (Zeller, 1846)
- Phyllonorycter phyllocytisi (M. Hering, 1936)
- Phyllonorycter platani (Staudinger, 1870)
- Phyllonorycter populifoliella (Treitschke, 1833)
- Phyllonorycter pumila A. & Z. Lastuvka, 2006
- Phyllonorycter purgantella (Chretien, 1915)
- Phyllonorycter quercifoliella (Zeller, 1839)
- Phyllonorycter rebimbasi (Mendes, 1910)
- Phyllonorycter robiniella (Clemens, 1859)
- Phyllonorycter roboris (Zeller, 1839)
- Phyllonorycter salicicolella (Sircom, 1848)
- Phyllonorycter salictella (Zeller, 1846)
- Phyllonorycter scabiosella (Douglas, 1853)
- Phyllonorycter schreberella (Fabricius, 1781)
- Phyllonorycter scitulella (Duponchel, 1843)
- Phyllonorycter scopariella (Zeller, 1846)
- Phyllonorycter scorpius A. & Z. Lastuvka, 2006
- Phyllonorycter sorbi (Frey, 1855)
- Phyllonorycter spartocytisi (M. Hering, 1927)
- Phyllonorycter spinicolella (Zeller, 1846)
- Phyllonorycter suberifoliella (Zeller, 1850)
- Phyllonorycter telinella A. & Z. Lastuvka, 2006
- Phyllonorycter tridentatae A. & Z. Lastuvka, 2006
- Phyllonorycter trifasciella (Haworth, 1828)
- Phyllonorycter triflorella (Peyerimhoff, 1872)
- Phyllonorycter ulicicolella (Stainton, 1851)
- Phyllonorycter vueltas A. & Z. Lastuvka, 2006
- Povolnya leucapennella (Stephens, 1835)
- Spulerina simploniella (Fischer von Röslerstamm, 1840)

== Heliodinidae ==
- Heliodines roesella (Linnaeus, 1758)
- Antispila treitschkiella (Fischer von Röslerstamm, 1843)
- Heliozela sericiella (Haworth, 1828)
- Holocacista rivillei (Stainton, 1855)

== Hepialidae ==
- Hepialus humuli (Linnaeus, 1758)
- Pharmacis castillanus (Oberthur, 1883)
- Pharmacis fusconebulosa (DeGeer, 1778)
- Pharmacis lupulina (Linnaeus, 1758)
- Pharmacis pyrenaicus (Donzel, 1838)
- Triodia sylvina (Linnaeus, 1761)

== Heterogynidae ==
- Heterogynis andalusica Daniel, 1966
- Heterogynis canalensis Chapman, 1904
- Heterogynis paradoxa Rambur, 1837
- Heterogynis penella (Hübner, 1819)

== Incurvariidae ==
- Crinopteryx familiella Peyerimhoff, 1871
- Incurvaria koerneriella (Zeller, 1839)
- Incurvaria masculella (Denis & Schiffermuller, 1775)
- Incurvaria oehlmanniella (Hübner, 1796)
- Incurvaria pectinea Haworth, 1828

== Lasiocampidae ==
- Chondrostega vandalicia (Milliere, 1865)
- Dendrolimus pini (Linnaeus, 1758)
- Eriogaster catax (Linnaeus, 1758)
- Eriogaster lanestris (Linnaeus, 1758)
- Eriogaster rimicola (Denis & Schiffermuller, 1775)
- Euthrix potatoria (Linnaeus, 1758)
- Gastropacha quercifolia (Linnaeus, 1758)
- Gastropacha populifolia (Denis & Schiffermuller, 1775)
- Lasiocampa quercus (Linnaeus, 1758)
- Lasiocampa serrula (Guenee, 1858)
- Lasiocampa trifolii (Denis & Schiffermuller, 1775)
- Macrothylacia digramma Meade-Waldo, 1905
- Macrothylacia rubi (Linnaeus, 1758)
- Malacosoma castrensis (Linnaeus, 1758)
- Malacosoma neustria (Linnaeus, 1758)
- Malacosoma alpicola Staudinger, 1870
- Malacosoma franconica (Denis & Schiffermuller, 1775)
- Malacosoma laurae Lajonquiere, 1977
- Odonestis pruni (Linnaeus, 1758)
- Pachypasa limosa (de Villiers, 1827)
- Phyllodesma suberifolia (Duponchel, 1842)
- Phyllodesma ilicifolia (Linnaeus, 1758)
- Phyllodesma kermesifolia (Lajonquiere, 1960)
- Phyllodesma tremulifolia (Hübner, 1810)
- Poecilocampa alpina (Frey & Wullschlegel, 1874)
- Poecilocampa populi (Linnaeus, 1758)
- Psilogaster loti (Ochsenheimer, 1810)
- Streblote panda Hübner, 1820
- Trichiura ilicis (Rambur, 1866)
- Trichiura castiliana Spuler, 1908
- Trichiura crataegi (Linnaeus, 1758)

== Lecithoceridae ==
- Eurodachtha canigella (Caradja, 1920)
- Eurodachtha flavissimella (Mann, 1862)
- Eurodachtha pallicornella (Staudinger, 1859)
- Eurodachtha siculella (Wocke, 1889)
- Homaloxestis briantiella (Turati, 1879)
- Lecithocera nigrana (Duponchel, 1836)
- Odites kollarella (O. G. Costa, 1832)
- Odites ternatella (Staudinger, 1859)

== Limacodidae ==
- Apoda limacodes (Hufnagel, 1766)
- Heterogenea asella (Denis & Schiffermuller, 1775)
- Hoyosia codeti (Oberthur, 1883)

== Lyonetiidae ==
- Leucoptera aceris (Fuchs, 1903)
- Leucoptera adenocarpella (Staudinger, 1871)
- Leucoptera andalusica Mey, 1994
- Leucoptera astragali Mey & Corley, 1999
- Leucoptera coronillae (M. Hering, 1933)
- Leucoptera laburnella (Stainton, 1851)
- Leucoptera lotella (Stainton, 1859)
- Leucoptera malifoliella (O. Costa, 1836)
- Leucoptera sinuella (Reutti, 1853)
- Leucoptera spartifoliella (Hübner, 1813)
- Lyonetia clerkella (Linnaeus, 1758)
- Phyllobrostis daphneella Staudinger, 1859
- Phyllobrostis eremitella de Joannis, 1912
- Phyllobrostis fregenella Hartig, 1941
- Phyllobrostis jedmella Chretien, 1907

== Lypusidae ==
- Amphisbatis incongruella (Stainton, 1849)
- Pseudatemelia amparoella Vives, 1986
- Pseudatemelia detrimentella (Staudinger, 1859)
- Pseudatemelia filiella (Staudinger, 1859)
- Pseudatemelia flavifrontella (Denis & Schiffermuller, 1775)
- Pseudatemelia subochreella (Doubleday, 1859)
- Pseudatemelia xanthosoma (Rebel, 1900)
- Pseudatemelia josephinae (Toll, 1956)

== Micropterigidae ==
- Micropterix aglaella (Duponchel, 1838)
- Micropterix aruncella (Scopoli, 1763)
- Micropterix granatensis Heath, 1981
- Micropterix herminiella Corley, 2007
- Micropterix ibericella Caradja, 1920
- Micropterix imperfectella Staudinger, 1859
- Micropterix minimella Heath, 1973
- Micropterix sicanella Zeller, 1847
- Micropterix stuebneri Zeller, Werno & Kurz, 2013
- Micropterix tunbergella (Fabricius, 1787)

== Millieridae ==
- Millieria dolosalis (Heydenreich, 1851)

== Momphidae ==
- Mompha langiella (Hübner, 1796)
- Mompha miscella (Denis & Schiffermuller, 1775)
- Mompha divisella Herrich-Schäffer, 1854
- Mompha epilobiella (Denis & Schiffermuller, 1775)
- Mompha jurassicella (Frey, 1881)
- Mompha lacteella (Stephens, 1834)
- Mompha ochraceella (Curtis, 1839)
- Mompha propinquella (Stainton, 1851)
- Mompha subbistrigella (Haworth, 1828)
- Mompha locupletella (Denis & Schiffermuller, 1775)
- Mompha terminella (Humphreys & Westwood, 1845)
- Urodeta hibernella (Staudinger, 1859)

== See also ==
- List of Iberian butterflies
