= Schistophila =

Scientific classification
- Domain: Eukaryota
- Kingdom: Animalia
- Phylum: Arthropoda
- Class: Insecta
- Order: Lepidoptera
- Family: Gelechiidae
- Subfamily: Gelechiinae
- Tribe: Litini
- Genus: Schistophila; Chrétien, 1899

Genus of moths

Schistophila is a genus of moths in the family Gelechiidae.

== Species ==
- Schistophila fuscella Forbes, 1931
- Schistophila laurocistella Chrétien, 1899
