= Schistophila fuscella =

Scientific classification
- Kingdom: Animalia
- Phylum: Arthropoda
- Clade: Pancrustacea
- Class: Insecta
- Order: Lepidoptera
- Family: Gelechiidae
- Genus: Schistophila
- Species: S. fuscella

Binomial name
- Schistophila fuscella Forbes, 1931

Species of moth

Schistophila fuscella is a moth of the family Gelechiidae. It is found in Puerto Rico.
