= Phyllonorycter genistella =

Scientific classification
- Domain: Eukaryota
- Kingdom: Animalia
- Phylum: Arthropoda
- Class: Insecta
- Order: Lepidoptera
- Family: Gracillariidae
- Genus: Phyllonorycter
- Species: P. genistella

Binomial name
- Phyllonorycter genistella (Rebel, 1900)

Synonyms
- Lithocolletis genistella Rebel, 1900

Species of moth

Phyllonorycter genistella is a moth of the family Gracillariidae. It is known from the Iberian Peninsula.

The larvae feed on Genista florida. They mine the leaves of their host plant.
