= Phyllonorycter echinosparti =

Scientific classification
- Domain: Eukaryota
- Kingdom: Animalia
- Phylum: Arthropoda
- Class: Insecta
- Order: Lepidoptera
- Family: Gracillariidae
- Genus: Phyllonorycter
- Species: P. echinosparti

Binomial name
- Phyllonorycter echinosparti A. & Z. Lastuvka, 2006

Synonyms
- Phyllonorycter scorpius A. & Z. Lastuvka, 2006

Species of moth

Phyllonorycter echinosparti is a moth of the family Gracillariidae. It is known from Portugal and western and central Spain.

The larvae feed on Echinospartum lusitanicum, Genista cinerascens, Genista florida, Genista hystrix, Genista polyanthos, Genista scorpius and Stauracanthus genistoides. They mine the thorns of their host plant.
