= Phyllonorycter vueltas =

Scientific classification
- Domain: Eukaryota
- Kingdom: Animalia
- Phylum: Arthropoda
- Class: Insecta
- Order: Lepidoptera
- Family: Gracillariidae
- Genus: Phyllonorycter
- Species: P. vueltas

Binomial name
- Phyllonorycter vueltas A. & Z. Lastuvka, 2006

Species of moth

Phyllonorycter vueltas is a moth of the family Gracillariidae. It is known from the Iberian Peninsula.

Adults have been recorded on wing from June to August.

The larvae feed on Genista florida and Genista cinerascens. They mine in the stem of their host plant.
