= Schistophila laurocistella =

Scientific classification
- Domain: Eukaryota
- Kingdom: Animalia
- Phylum: Arthropoda
- Class: Insecta
- Order: Lepidoptera
- Family: Gelechiidae
- Genus: Schistophila
- Species: S. laurocistella

Binomial name
- Schistophila laurocistella Chrétien, 1899

Synonyms
- Schistophila striatana Lucas, 1937

Species of moth

Schistophila laurocistella is a moth of the family Gelechiidae. It is found in Morocco, Portugal, Spain and southern France.

The wingspan is 6–7 mm.

The larvae feed on Cistus species, including Cistus laurifolius. They mine the leaves of their host plant.
