= Aristotelia mirabilis =

Scientific classification
- Kingdom: Animalia
- Phylum: Arthropoda
- Clade: Pancrustacea
- Class: Insecta
- Order: Lepidoptera
- Family: Gelechiidae
- Genus: Aristotelia
- Species: A. mirabilis

Binomial name
- Aristotelia mirabilis (Christoph, 1888)

Synonyms
- Ergatis mirabilis Christoph, 1888; Aristotelia osthelderi Rebel, 1935

Species of moth

Aristotelia mirabilis is a moth of the family Gelechiidae. It is found in Portugal, Ukraine, Russia and Turkey.
