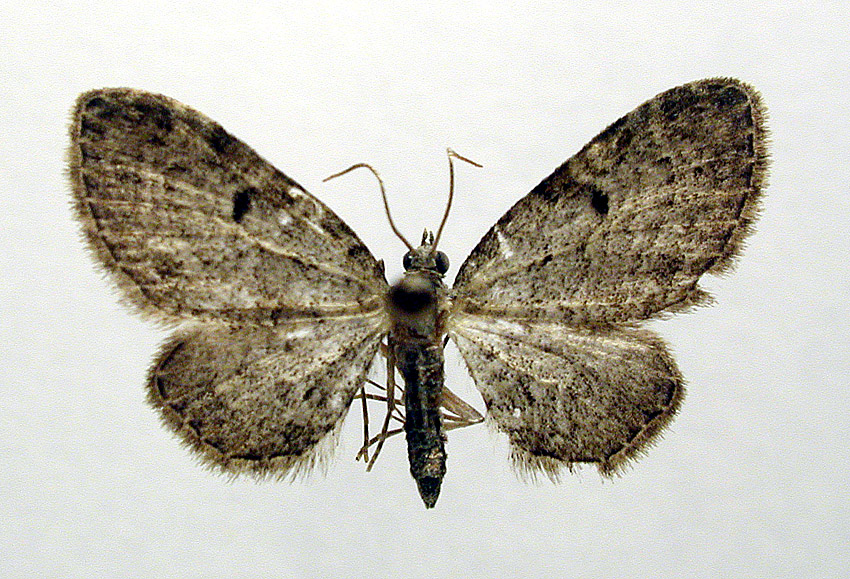

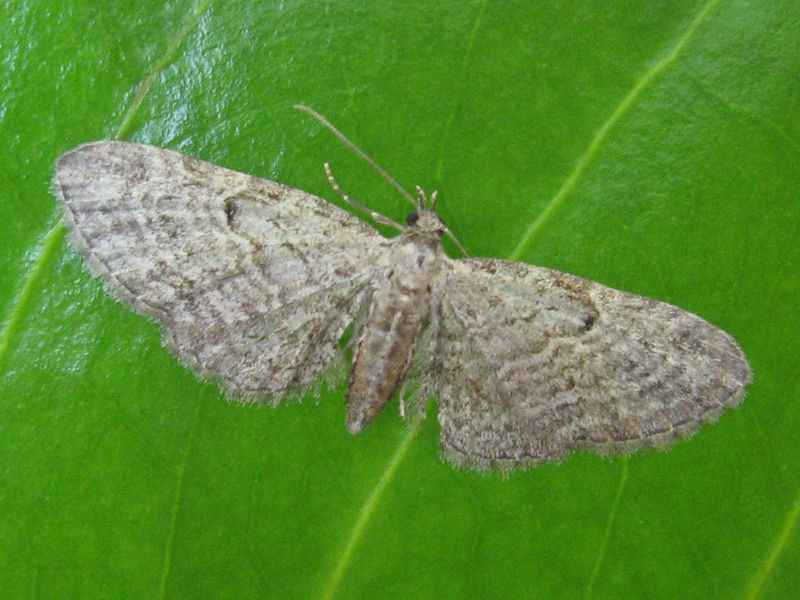

Scientific classification
- Domain: Eukaryota
- Kingdom: Animalia
- Phylum: Arthropoda
- Class: Insecta
- Order: Lepidoptera
- Family: Geometridae
- Genus: Eupithecia
- Species: E. tenuiata

Binomial name
- Eupithecia tenuiata (Hübner, 1813)

Synonyms
- Geometra tenuiata Hubner, 1813; Eupithecia macellata Fischer von Röslerstamm, 1827

= Slender pug =

Eupithecia tenuiata

Species of moth

The slender pug (Eupithecia tenuiata) is a moth of the family Geometridae. It was first described by Jacob Hübner in 1813 and is found throughout Europe and western parts of the Palearctic. The larva feeds on the catkins of willow (Salix species).

== Life cycle and description ==
A single brooded species, this is one of the smallest of the geometrids, with a wingspan of only 14–16 mm. The forewing ground colour is light greyish ochreous. There are numerous curved dark fuscous striae, the veins and costa are ochreous brown. The edges of the biangulate median band form dark costal spots. The forewing has a dark ovoid discal mark. The forewings lack a tornal spot and the hindwings are whitish grey with dark striae, and a small discal spot.

It flies at night in June and July and is attracted to light and can be found by day at rest on the trunks of large sallows.

=== Ova ===
When first laid, the eggs are cream and they change to dark red before over wintering. The 0.06 mm eggs can be found from June to early March on willows. The egg is laid in cracks in bark of sallow and hibernates.

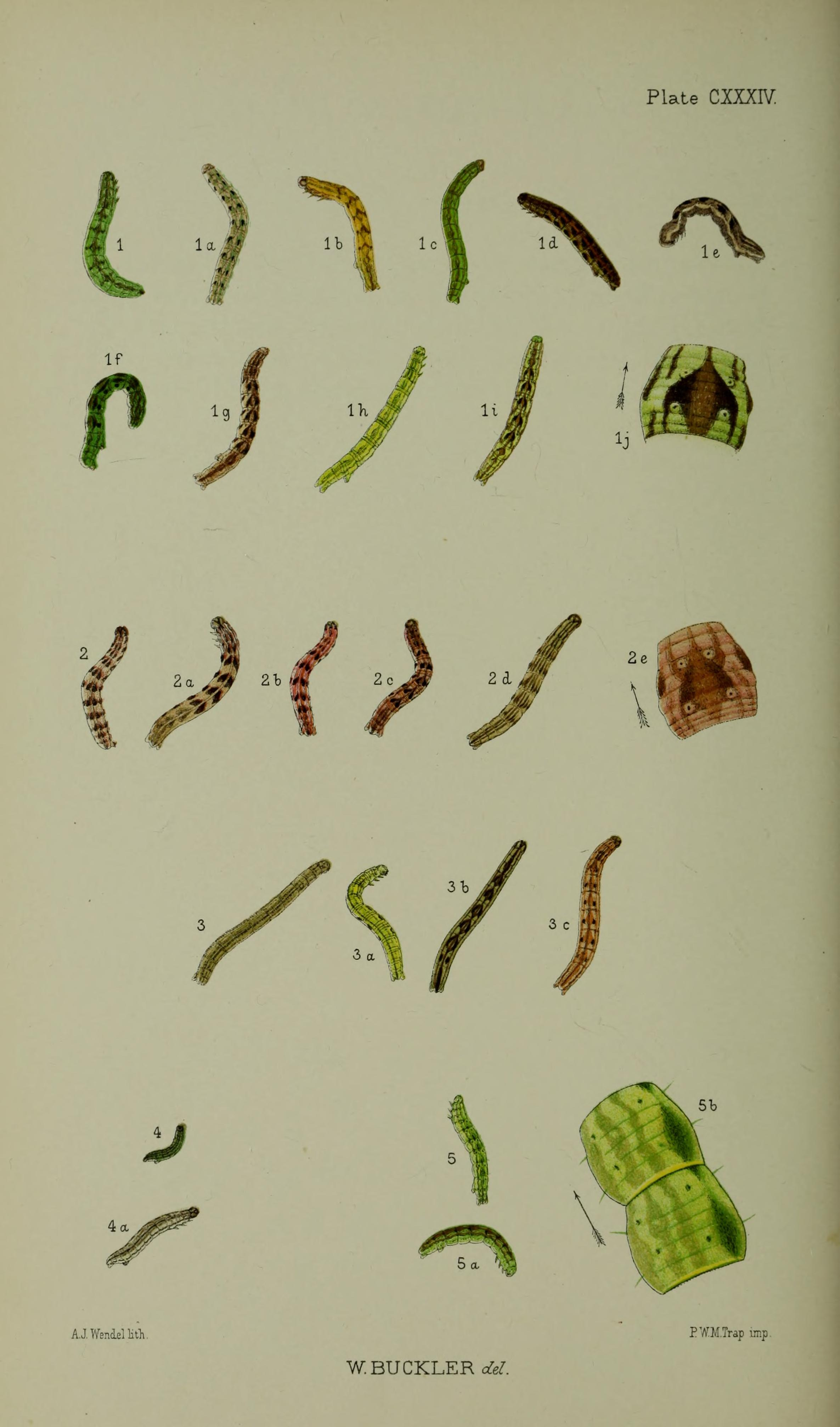
Figs 4, 4a larvae in various stages of growth

=== Larva ===
The larvae feed internally on the catkins of male willows and externally on female catkins from February to April. They are mostly found on goat willow (S. caprea) but also on eared (S. aurita) and grey willows (S. caprea). Fully grown, a larva is 14−16 mm long and has a dull-green body with indistinct blackish markings along the dorsal area. The head is almost black and the first segment is marked with brown.

=== Pupa ===
Pupation is in a tough cocoon on the soil surface or among fallen catkins in May and June. It takes approximately six weeks.

== Distribution ==
Found throughout Europe as well as Armenia the Caucasus, Georgia and Turkey.
