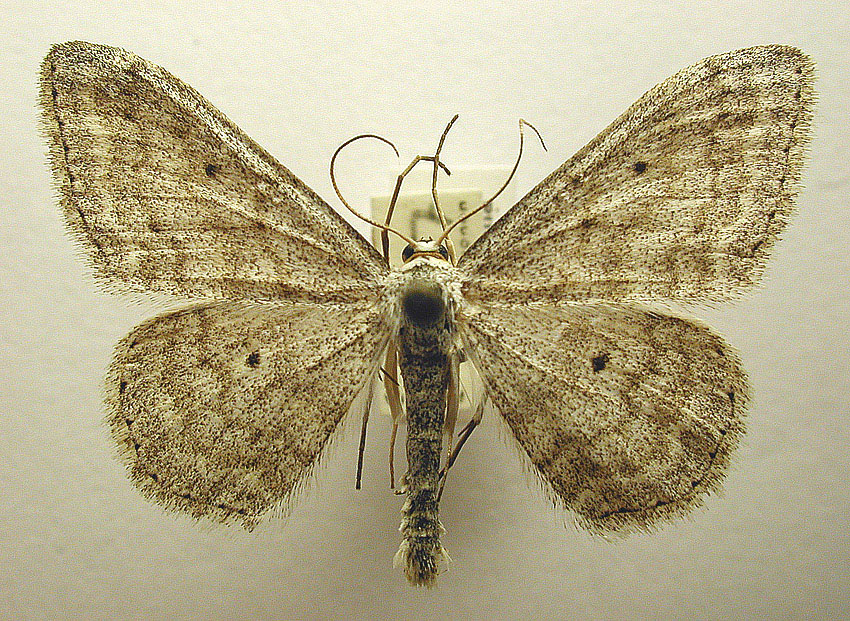

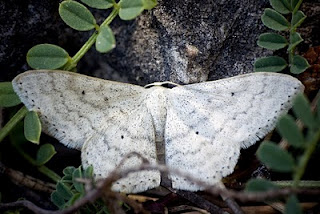

Scientific classification
- Kingdom: Animalia
- Phylum: Arthropoda
- Class: Insecta
- Order: Lepidoptera
- Family: Geometridae
- Genus: Scopula
- Species: S. incanata

Binomial name
- Scopula incanata (Linnaeus, 1758)

Synonyms
- Phalaena incanata Linnaeus 1758; Phalaena mediata Fabricius 1776; Phalaena variegata Scopoli 1763; Acidalia ibericata Reisser 1935; Acidalia adjunctaria Boisduval, 1840; Dosithea demutaria Bruand 1846; Idaea mutata Treitschke 1828; Acidalia mutataria Duponchel 1830

= Scopula incanata =

Species of geometer moth in subfamily Sterrhinae

Scopula incanata is a species of moth in the family Geometridae. It is found from north-eastern Europe and the Caucasus to southern Siberia and northern Mongolia.

The wingspan is 25–28 mm. Adults are on wing from late July to August in one generation per year.

The larvae feed on Thymus and Polygonum species. Larvae can be found from August to May. It overwinters in the larval stage.

== Subspecies ==
- Scopula incanata incanata
- Scopula incanata ibericata Reisser 1935
- Scopula incanata rubeni Viidalepp, 1979
