= Phyllonorycter baetica =

Scientific classification
- Domain: Eukaryota
- Kingdom: Animalia
- Phylum: Arthropoda
- Class: Insecta
- Order: Lepidoptera
- Family: Gracillariidae
- Genus: Phyllonorycter
- Species: P. baetica

Binomial name
- Phyllonorycter baetica A. & Z. Lastuvka, 2006

Synonyms
- Phyllonorycter lobeliella Nel, 2009

Species of moth

Phyllonorycter baetica is a moth of the family Gracillariidae. It is found in Spain and France.

The larvae feed on members of the genus Genista including G. lobelii, G. cinerascens and G. versicolor. They mine the stem and thorns of their host plant.
