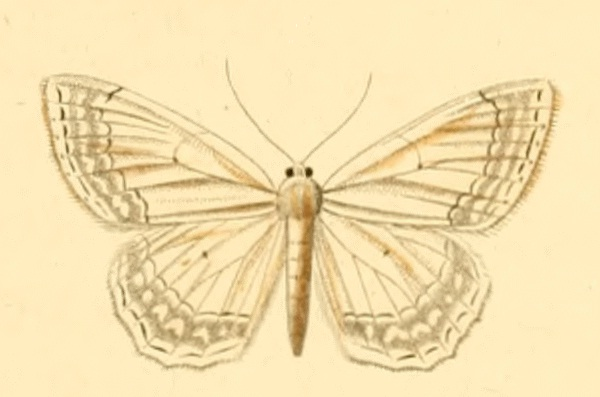

Scientific classification
- Domain: Eukaryota
- Kingdom: Animalia
- Phylum: Arthropoda
- Class: Insecta
- Order: Lepidoptera
- Family: Geometridae
- Genus: Scopula
- Species: S. concinnaria

Binomial name
- Scopula concinnaria (Duponchel, 1842)

Synonyms
- Dosithea concinnaria Duponchel, 1842; Acidalia concinnata Guenee, 1858; Acidalia hesperidata Staudinger, 1871; Acidalia universaria Zerny, 1927

= Scopula concinnaria =

Species of geometer moth in subfamily Sterrhinae

Scopula concinnaria is a moth of the family Geometridae. It was described by Philogène Auguste Joseph Duponchel in 1842. It is endemic to Spain.

== Subspecies ==
- Scopula concinnaria concinnaria
- Scopula concinnaria universaria (Zerny 1927) (Spain: Aragon)
