= Scrobipalpa suaedivorella =

Scientific classification
- Domain: Eukaryota
- Kingdom: Animalia
- Phylum: Arthropoda
- Class: Insecta
- Order: Lepidoptera
- Family: Gelechiidae
- Genus: Scrobipalpa
- Species: S. suaedivorella

Binomial name
- Scrobipalpa suaedivorella (Chrétien, 1915)

Synonyms
- Lita suaedivorella Chrétien, 1915; Lita detersipunctella Toll, 1947

Species of moth

Scrobipalpa suaedivorella is a moth in the family Gelechiidae. It was described by Pierre Chrétien in 1915. It is found in Tunisia, Algeria, Spain, south-western Russia, Turkey and Iran.

The wingspan is 14–15 mm (0.55–0.59 in). The forewings are ochreous whitish, lightly tinged with red. The hindwings are white.

The larvae feed on Suaeda species, including Suaeda drepanophylla, Suaeda microphylla and Suaeda physophora. They spin twigs together and mine the leaves.
