= Dichomeris cisti =

Scientific classification
- Domain: Eukaryota
- Kingdom: Animalia
- Phylum: Arthropoda
- Class: Insecta
- Order: Lepidoptera
- Family: Gelechiidae
- Genus: Dichomeris
- Species: D. cisti

Binomial name
- Dichomeris cisti (Staudinger, 1859)

Synonyms
- Hypsolophus cisti Staudinger, 1859

Species of moth

Dichomeris cisti is a moth of the family Gelechiidae. It is found in Spain.

The wingspan is about 16 mm. The forewings are mouse-grey, with black scales. The hindwings are lighter grey.
