= Phyllonorycter hesperiella =

Scientific classification
- Domain: Eukaryota
- Kingdom: Animalia
- Phylum: Arthropoda
- Class: Insecta
- Order: Lepidoptera
- Family: Gracillariidae
- Genus: Phyllonorycter
- Species: P. hesperiella

Binomial name
- Phyllonorycter hesperiella (Staudinger, 1859)

Synonyms
- Lithocolletis hesperiella Staudinger, 1859

Species of moth

Phyllonorycter hesperiella is a moth of the family Gracillariidae. It is known from the Iberian Peninsula and is probably also found in northern Africa.

Adults have been recorded on wing from March to June. There are two or more generations per year.
