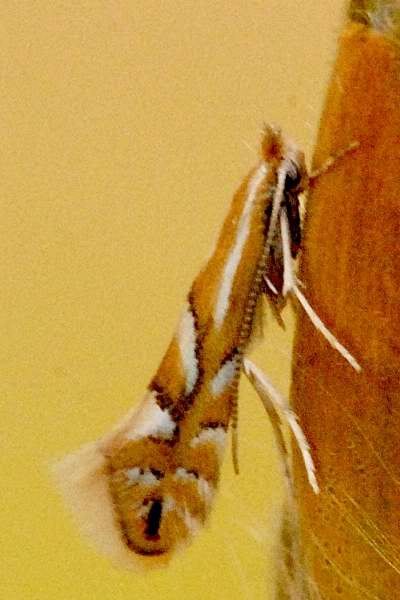

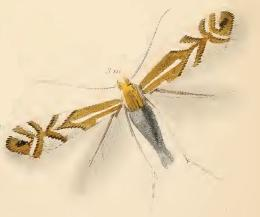

Scientific classification
- Domain: Eukaryota
- Kingdom: Animalia
- Phylum: Arthropoda
- Class: Insecta
- Order: Lepidoptera
- Family: Gracillariidae
- Genus: Phyllonorycter
- Species: P. maestingella

Binomial name
- Phyllonorycter maestingella (Müller, 1764)

Synonyms
- Tinea maestingella Müller, 1764

= Phyllonorycter maestingella =

Species of moth

Phyllonorycter maestingella is a moth of the family Gracillariidae. It is found in Europe, Russia and British Columbia, Canada.

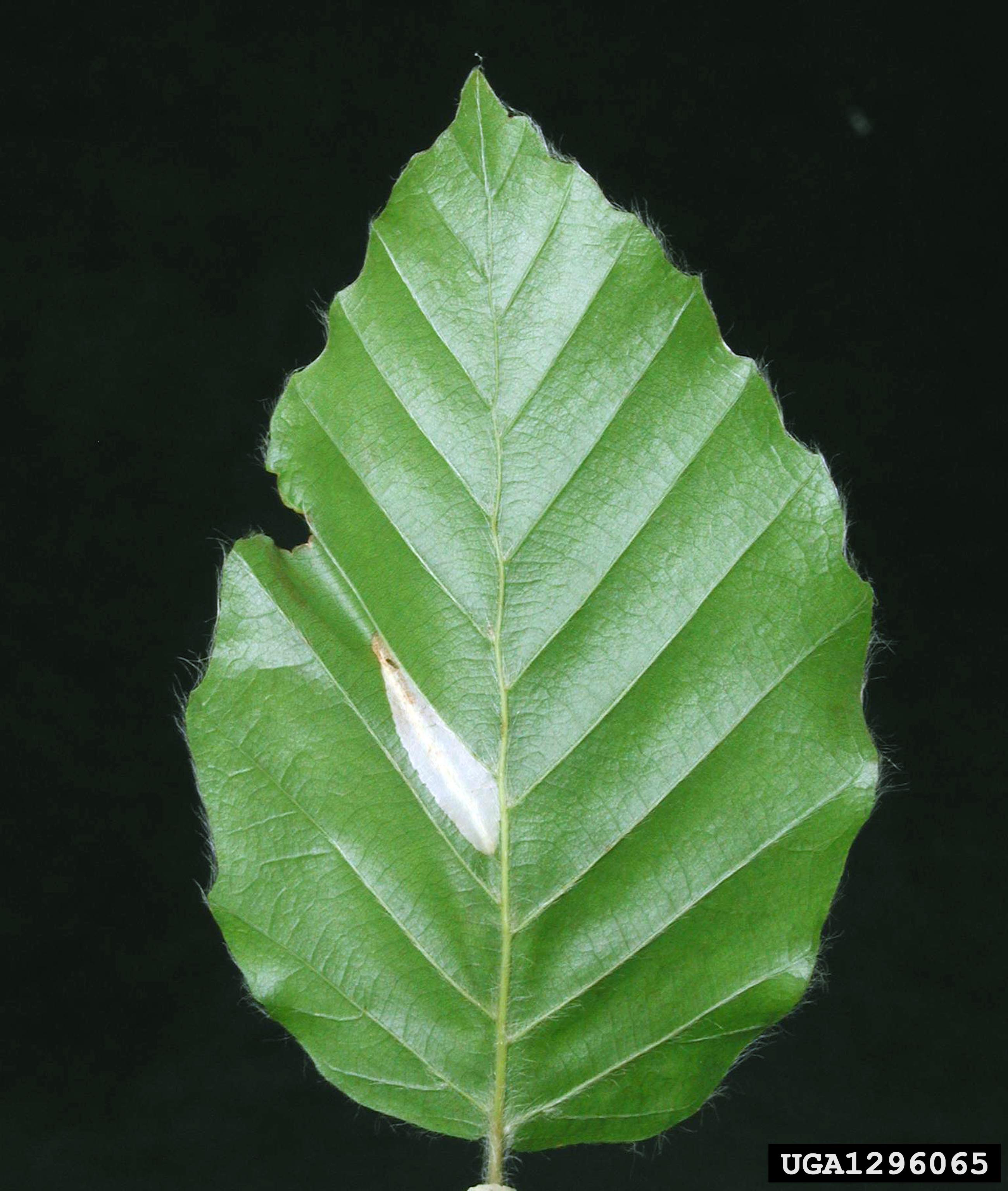
tubular mine between veins

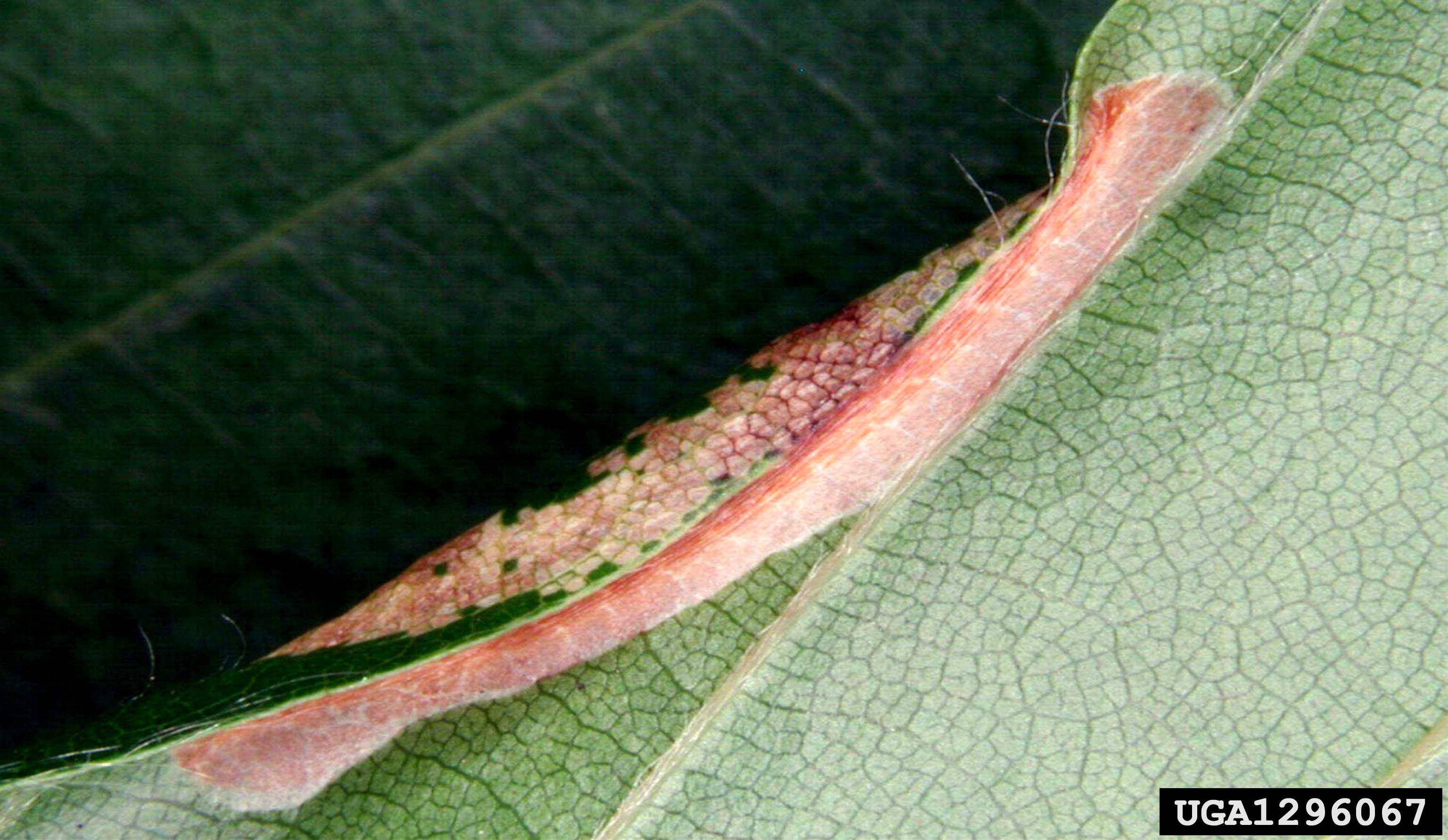
feeding signs of larva

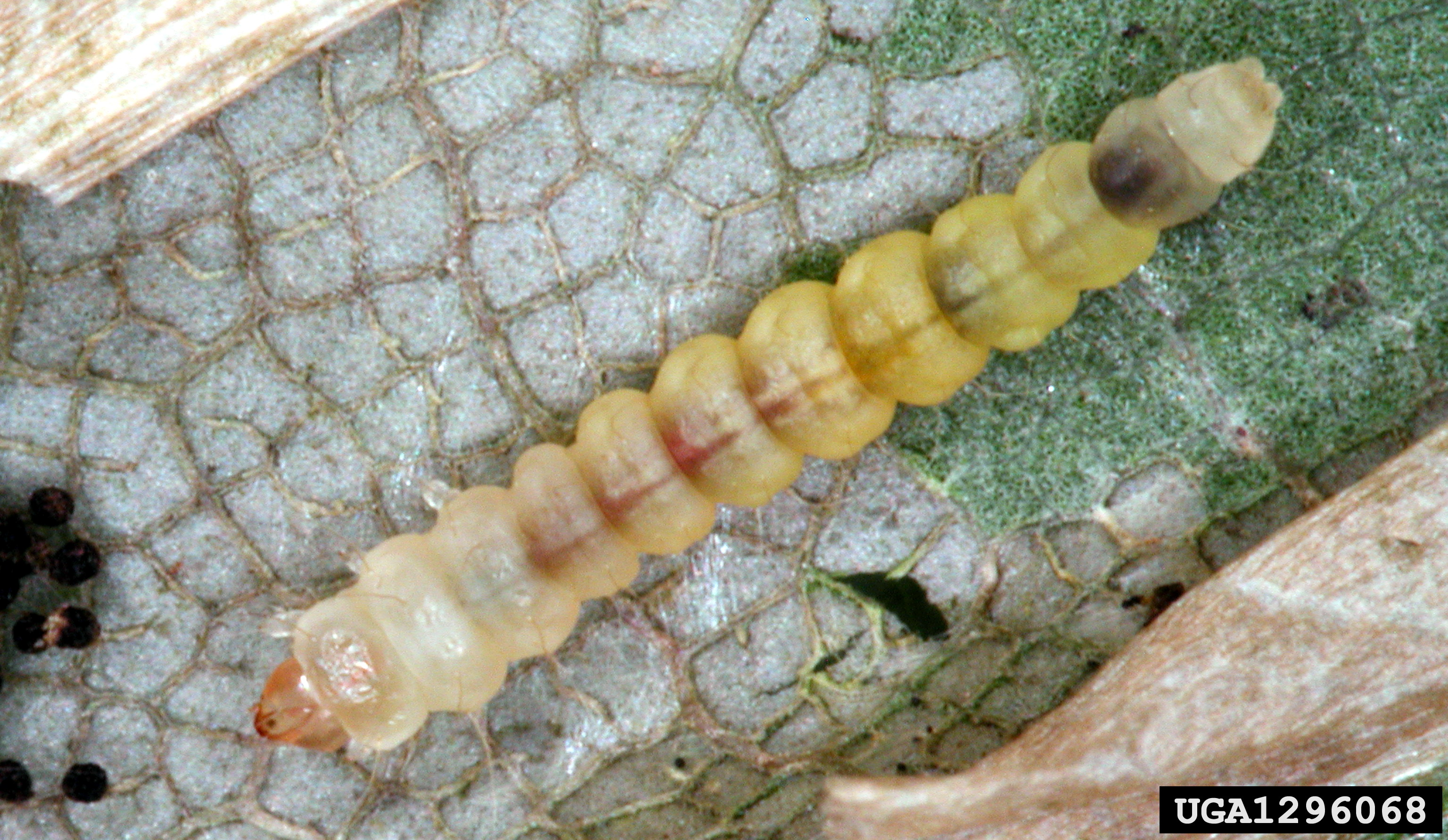
larva

The imago (moth) is bivoltine (depending on geographic location) flying in May and June and again in August. The wingspan is 7–9 mm and the wings have an intricate pattern of orange-brown, black and white.

The pale greenish-yellow larva feeds on beech (Fagus species) making a long blotch mine on the underside of the leaf, usually between two veins from midrib almost to leaf edge. If the mine is at the margin of the leaf it can cause it to fold downwards. The cocoon is to one side of the frass which is piled neatly along the middle of the mine.
