= Phyllonorycter kautziella =

Scientific classification
- Domain: Eukaryota
- Kingdom: Animalia
- Phylum: Arthropoda
- Class: Insecta
- Order: Lepidoptera
- Family: Gracillariidae
- Genus: Phyllonorycter
- Species: P. kautziella

Binomial name
- Phyllonorycter kautziella (Hartig, 1938)

Synonyms
- Lithocolletis kautziella Hartig, 1938

Species of moth

Phyllonorycter kautziella is a moth of the family Gracillariidae. It is known from all of Spain.
