= Phyllonorycter nevadensis =

Scientific classification
- Domain: Eukaryota
- Kingdom: Animalia
- Phylum: Arthropoda
- Class: Insecta
- Order: Lepidoptera
- Family: Gracillariidae
- Genus: Phyllonorycter
- Species: P. nevadensis

Binomial name
- Phyllonorycter nevadensis Walsingham, 1908

Species of moth

Phyllonorycter nevadensis is a moth of the family Gracillariidae. It is found in Spain.

The larvae feed on Adenocarpus decorticans. They mine the leaves of their host plant.
