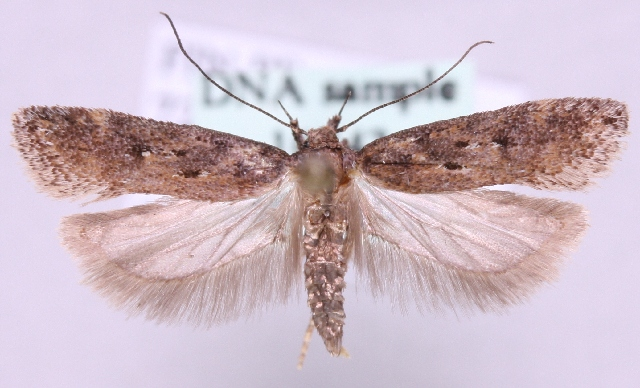

Scientific classification
- Kingdom: Animalia
- Phylum: Arthropoda
- Clade: Pancrustacea
- Class: Insecta
- Order: Lepidoptera
- Family: Gelechiidae
- Genus: Chionodes
- Species: C. distinctella

Binomial name
- Chionodes distinctella (Zeller, 1839)

Synonyms
- Gelechia distinctella Zeller, 1839; Gelechia indistinctella Rebel 1901; Gelechia striolatella Heinemann, 1870; Gelechia tristella Teich, 1889; Gelechia latiorella Amsel, 1939; Gelechia distinctella unicolor Toll, 1947; Chionodes deserticola Piskunov, 1979

= Chionodes distinctella =

Eastern groundling

Species of moth

Chionodes distinctella, the eastern groundling, is a moth of the family Gelechiidae. It is found in almost all of Europe (except Croatia), as well as most of Russia, Kazakhstan, Central Asia and North Africa. The habitat consists of dry, rocky heath and meadows and the verges and rough pastures.

The wingspan is 15–19 mm. The terminal joint of palpi is as long as second. Forewings are brown, usually mixed with dark fuscous; usually indistinct dark fuscous spots on costa near base, at 1/4, and beyond middle, and in disc near base and at 1/4; stigmata black, often partly edged with whitish, first discal beyond plical; an indistinct pale ferruginous-tinged angulated fascia at 3/4, sometimes almost obsolete. Hindwings over 1, light grey.

Adults have been recorded on wing from early June to October in two generations per year in western Europe.

The larvae feed within the roots of Genista and Thymus species, as well as Artemisia campestris.
