= Scrobipalpa heretica =

Scientific classification
- Kingdom: Animalia
- Phylum: Arthropoda
- Clade: Pancrustacea
- Class: Insecta
- Order: Lepidoptera
- Family: Gelechiidae
- Genus: Scrobipalpa
- Species: S. heretica

Binomial name
- Scrobipalpa heretica Povolný, 1973

Synonyms
- Scrobipalpa submagnificella Povolný, 1977

Species of moth

Scrobipalpa heretica is a moth of the family Gelechiidae. It is in southern China (Xinjiang), Russia (the southern Ural, Volga region), Turkey, Iran, Afghanistan, Kazakhstan and the Altai.
