= Phyllonorycter andalusicus =

Scientific classification
- Domain: Eukaryota
- Kingdom: Animalia
- Phylum: Arthropoda
- Class: Insecta
- Order: Lepidoptera
- Family: Gracillariidae
- Genus: Phyllonorycter
- Species: P. andalusicus

Binomial name
- Phyllonorycter andalusicus A. & Z. Lastuvka, 2006

Species of moth

Phyllonorycter andalusicus is a moth of the family Gracillariidae. It is found in Spain.

Adults have been recorded on wing from May to June, probably in one generation per year.

The larvae probably feed on Genista umbellata. They mine the stems and thorns of their host plant.
