= Eupithecia chalikophila =

Scientific classification
- Domain: Eukaryota
- Kingdom: Animalia
- Phylum: Arthropoda
- Class: Insecta
- Order: Lepidoptera
- Family: Geometridae
- Genus: Eupithecia
- Species: E. chalikophila

Binomial name
- Eupithecia chalikophila Wehrli, 1926

Species of moth

Eupithecia chalikophila is a moth in the family Geometridae. It is found in Spain and North Africa.
