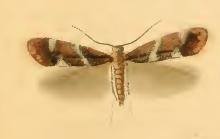

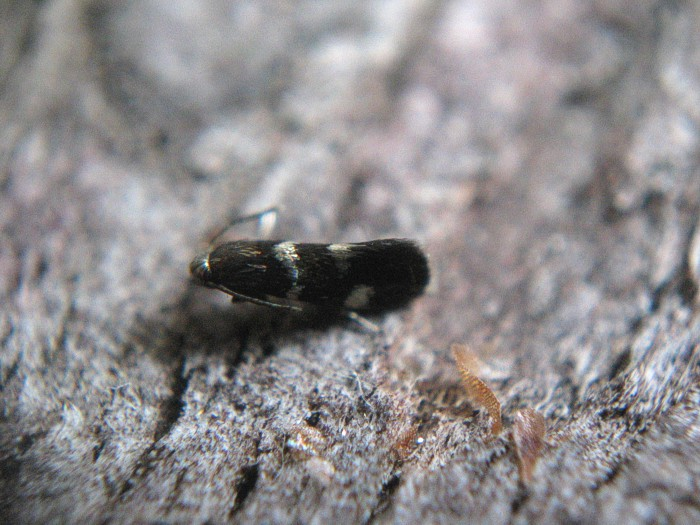

Scientific classification
- Domain: Eukaryota
- Kingdom: Animalia
- Phylum: Arthropoda
- Class: Insecta
- Order: Lepidoptera
- Family: Heliozelidae
- Genus: Antispila
- Species: A. treitschkiella

Binomial name
- Antispila treitschkiella (Fischer von Röslerstamm, 1843)

Synonyms
- Elachista treitschkiella Fischer von Röslerstamm 1843; Antispila petryi Martini, 1898; Antispila stachjanella Dziurzynski, 1948; Antispila treitschkeella

= Antispila treitschkiella =

Species of moth

Antispila treitschkiella is a species of moth of the family Heliozelidae. It is found from Great Britain to Ukraine and from Sweden to France, Italy and Greece. It is also found in Portugal.

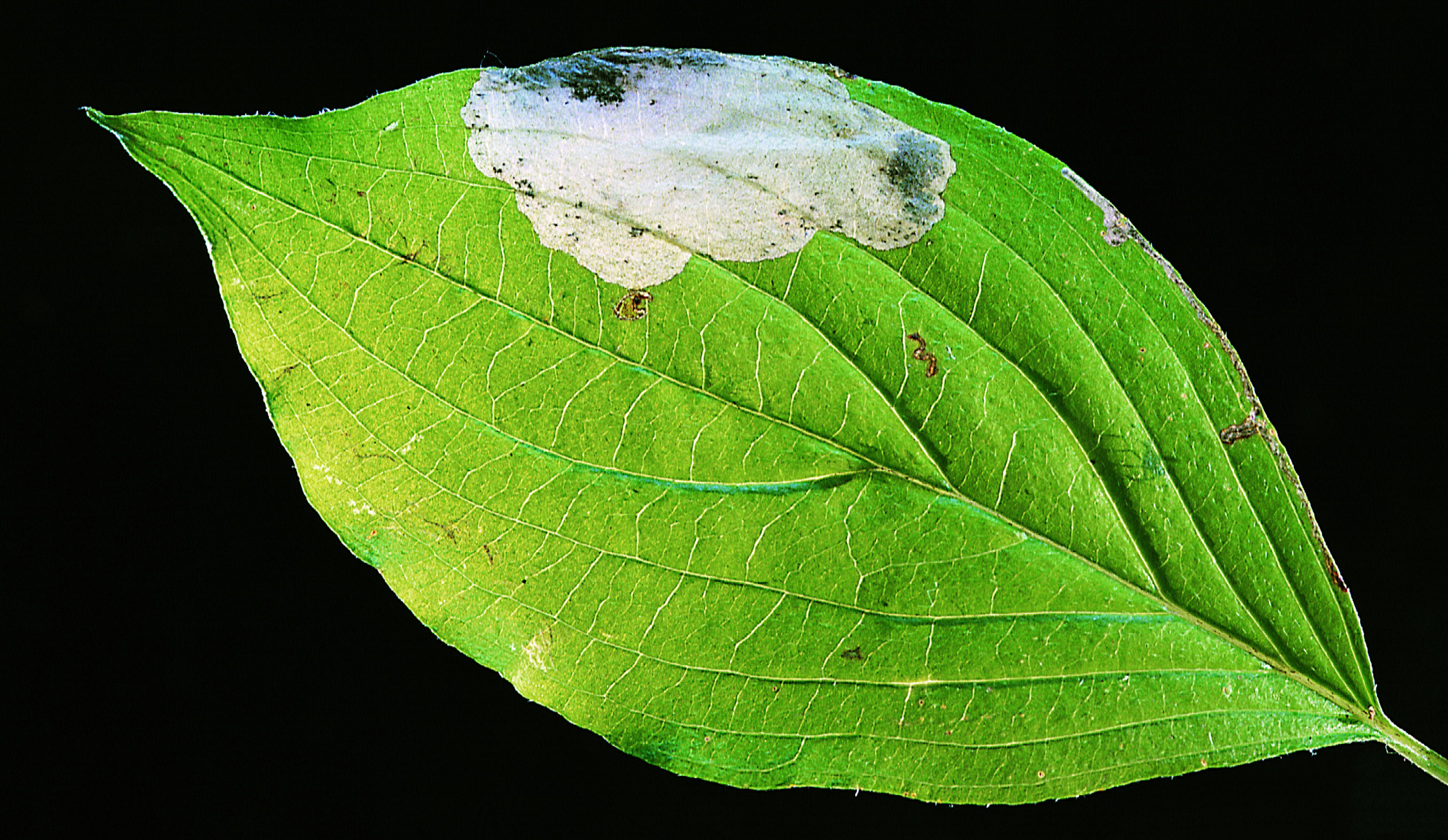
Damage

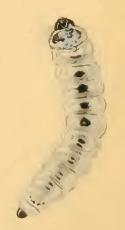
Larva

Larval case, with spiny projections

The wingspan is about 6 mm. Adults are on wing from the end of April to the beginning of June and from July to August.

The larvae feed on Cornus mas and Cornus sanguinea. They mine the leaves of their host plant. Larvae can be found in July and from the end of August to early October. The species overwinters in the larval stage, within the case.
