= Phyllonorycter aroniae =

Scientific classification
- Domain: Eukaryota
- Kingdom: Animalia
- Phylum: Arthropoda
- Class: Insecta
- Order: Lepidoptera
- Family: Gracillariidae
- Genus: Phyllonorycter
- Species: P. aroniae

Binomial name
- Phyllonorycter aroniae (M. Hering, 1936)

Synonyms
- Lithocolletis aroniae M. Hering, 1936

Species of moth

Phyllonorycter aroniae is a moth of the family Gracillariidae. It is found in Spain.
