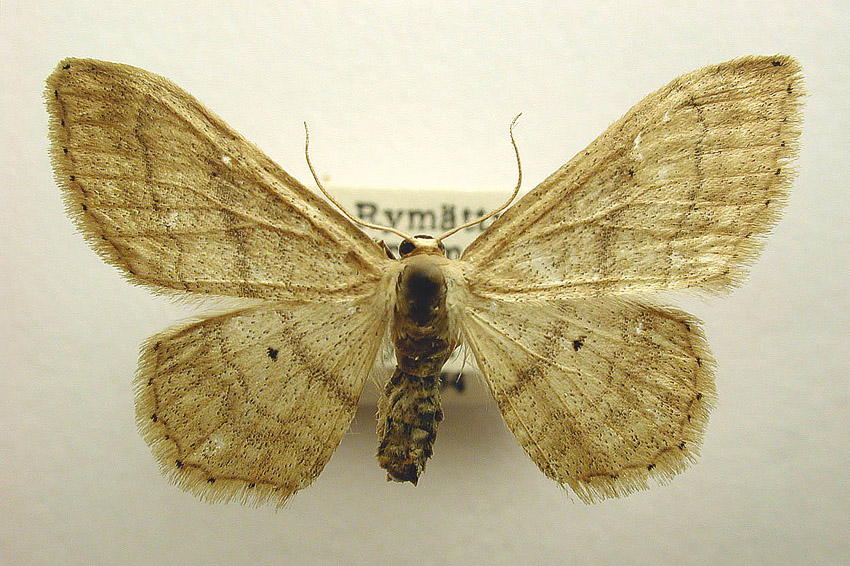

Scientific classification
- Kingdom: Animalia
- Phylum: Arthropoda
- Clade: Pancrustacea
- Class: Insecta
- Order: Lepidoptera
- Family: Geometridae
- Genus: Idaea
- Species: I. deversaria

Binomial name
- Idaea deversaria (Herrich-Schäffer, 1847)

Synonyms
- Idaea maritimaria

= Idaea deversaria =

Species of moth

Idaea deversaria is a moth of the family Geometridae. It is found in most of Europe, east to central Asia and southern Siberia.

The wingspan is 22–28 mm. The adults fly from June to July.

The larvae feed on low growing plants and deciduous trees.

== Notes ==
1. The flight season refers to Germany. This may vary in other parts of the range.
