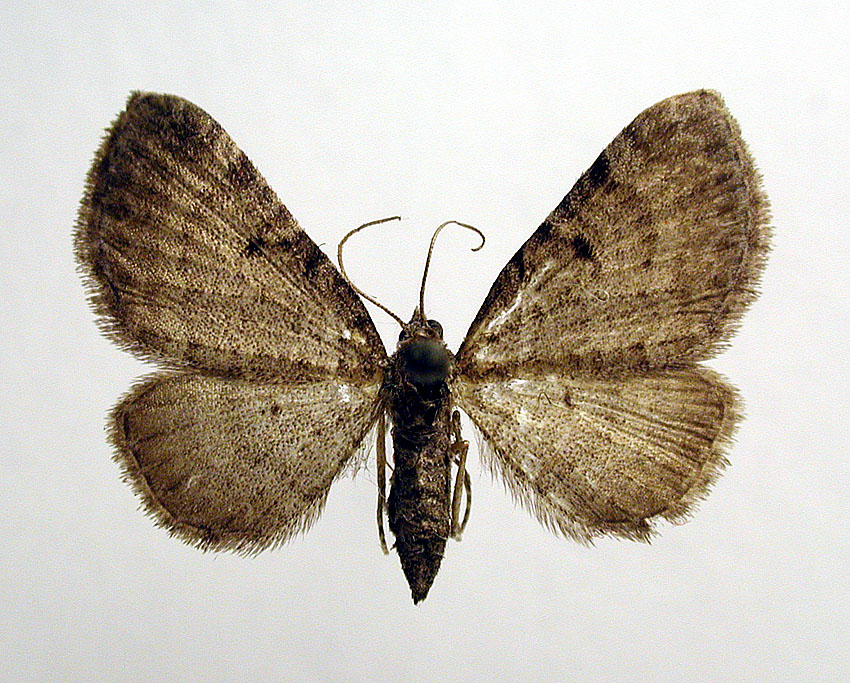

Scientific classification
- Domain: Eukaryota
- Kingdom: Animalia
- Phylum: Arthropoda
- Class: Insecta
- Order: Lepidoptera
- Family: Geometridae
- Genus: Eupithecia
- Species: E. selinata

Binomial name
- Eupithecia selinata Herrich-Schäffer, 1861

Synonyms
- Eupithecia divina Vojnits, 1981; Eupithecia silenata (misspelling}

= Eupithecia selinata =

Species of moth

Eupithecia selinata is a moth of the family Geometridae. It is found from Japan through the Amur Region, Siberia, the Urals, Caucasus and Russia to western Europe and from southern Fennoscandia to the Alps.

The wingspan is 18–21 mm. The fore- and hindwings are dark greyish brown. There is one generation per year with adults on wing from the end of May to August.

The larvae feed on various Apiaceae species, including Aegopodium podagraria, Heracleum sphondylium, Peucedanum oreoselinum, Peucedanum palustre and Angelica sylvestris. Larvae can be found from June to September. It overwinters as a pupa.

== Subspecies ==
- Eupithecia selinata selinata
- Eupithecia selinata fusei Inoue, 1980
- Eupithecia selinata tenebricosa Dietze, 1910
