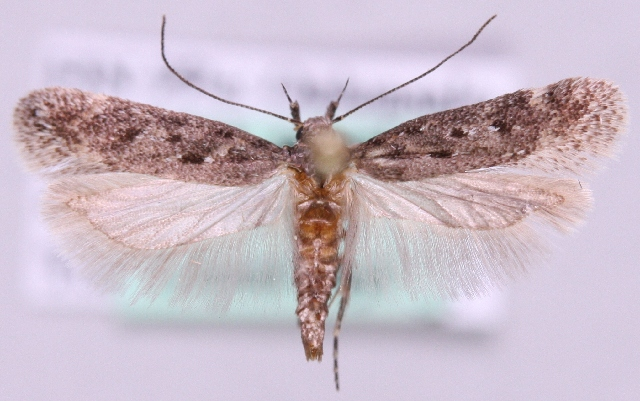

Scientific classification
- Kingdom: Animalia
- Phylum: Arthropoda
- Clade: Pancrustacea
- Class: Insecta
- Order: Lepidoptera
- Family: Gelechiidae
- Genus: Chionodes
- Species: C. fumatella

Binomial name
- Chionodes fumatella (Douglas, 1850)

Synonyms
- Gelechia fumatella Douglas, 1850; Chionodes carpella Piskunov, 1971; Gelechia opletella Herrich-Schaffer, 1854; Gelechia celerella Stainton, 1851; Gelechia nigricans Heinemann, 1870; Gelechia reuttiella Heinemann, 1870; Gelechia syrticola Staudinger, 1871; Gelechia nigricans var. brunnea Teich, 1901

= Chionodes fumatella =

Downland groundling

Species of moth

Chionodes fumatella, the downland groundling, is a moth of the family Gelechiidae. It is found in almost all of Europe (except Portugal and Croatia). Outside of Europe, it is found in Turkey, the Caucasus, Mongolia and from Siberia to the Russian Far East.

The wingspan is 12–19 mm. The terminal joint of palpi as long as second. Forewings brown, usually mixed with dark fuscous; usually indistinct dark fuscous spots on costa near base, at 4, and beyond middle, and in disc near base and at 4; stigmata black, often partly edged with whitish, first discal beyond plical; an indistinct pale ferruginous-tinged angulated fascia at 3/4, sometimes almost. obsolete. Hindwings light grey.

Adults have been recorded on wing from June to August. The larvae have been reared on Lotus corniculatus.
