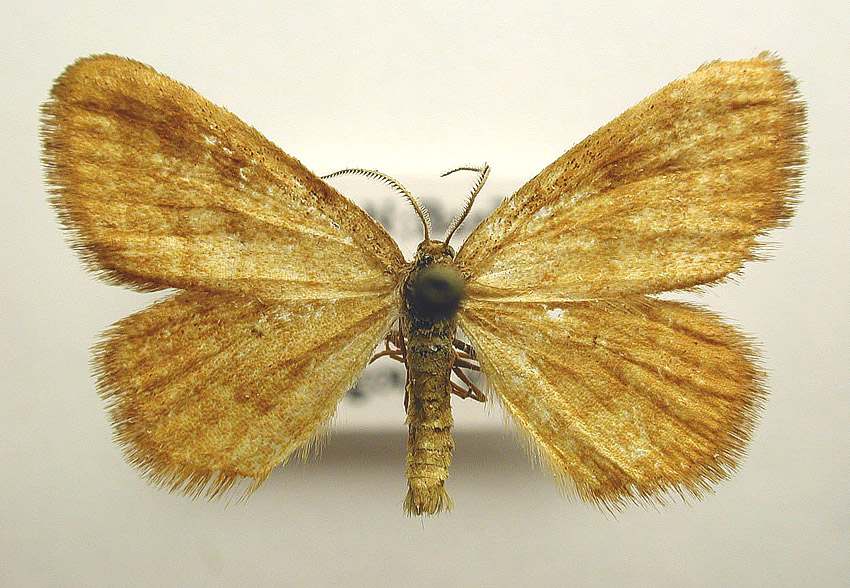

Scientific classification
- Kingdom: Animalia
- Phylum: Arthropoda
- Clade: Pancrustacea
- Class: Insecta
- Order: Lepidoptera
- Family: Geometridae
- Genus: Idaea
- Species: I. serpentata

Binomial name
- Idaea serpentata (Hufnagel, 1767)

= Idaea serpentata =

Ochraceous wave

Species of moth

Idaea serpentata, the ochraceous wave, is a moth of the family Geometridae. The species was first described by Johann Siegfried Hufnagel in 1767. It is found in most of continental Europe and the Near East.

The wingspan is about 22 mm. The adults fly from late June to early August. They are attracted to light.

The larvae feed on various herbaceous plants such as Galium, Taraxacum, Rumex and Thymus.

== Notes ==
1. The flight season refers to Belgium. This may vary in other parts of the range.
