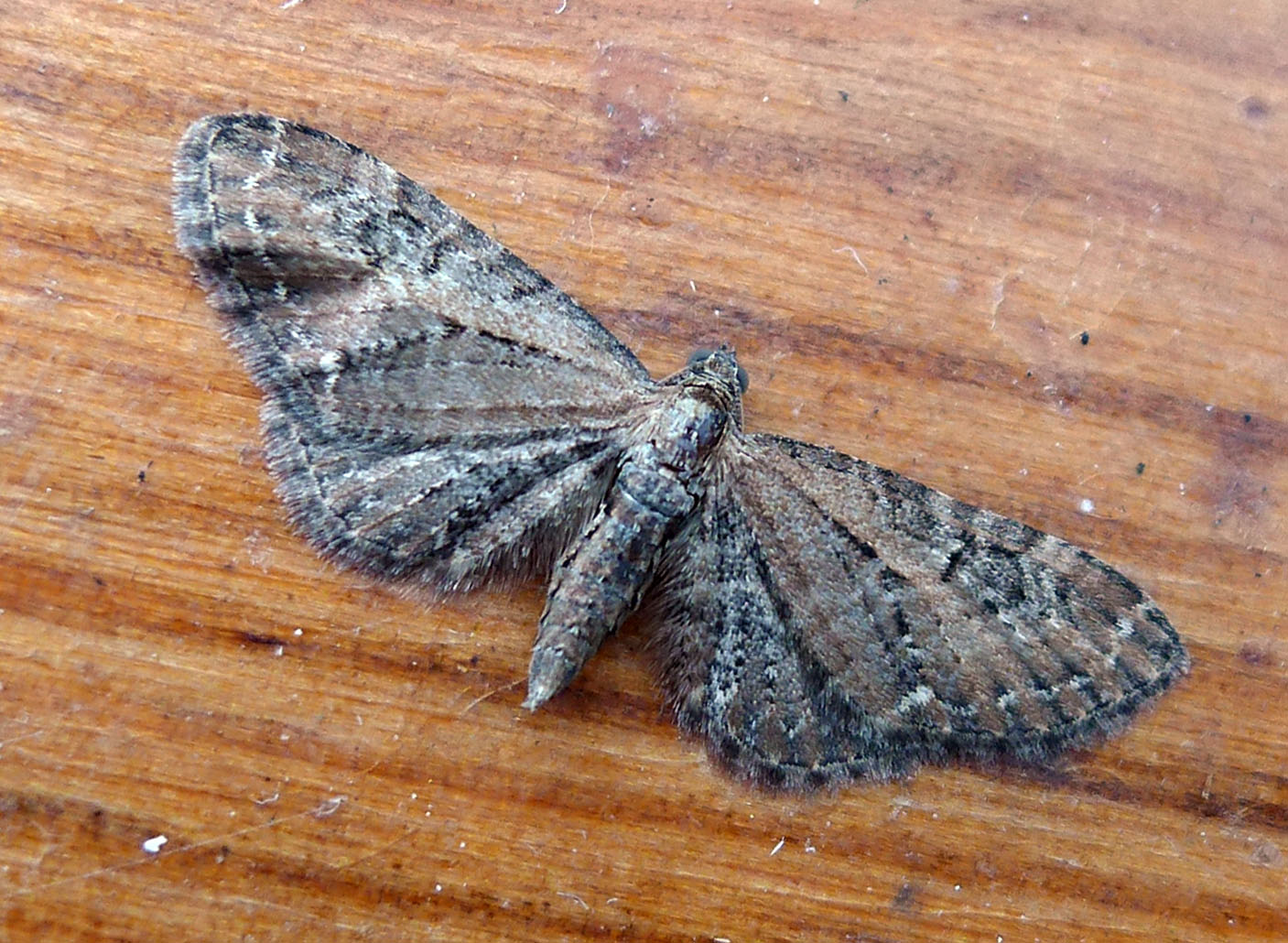

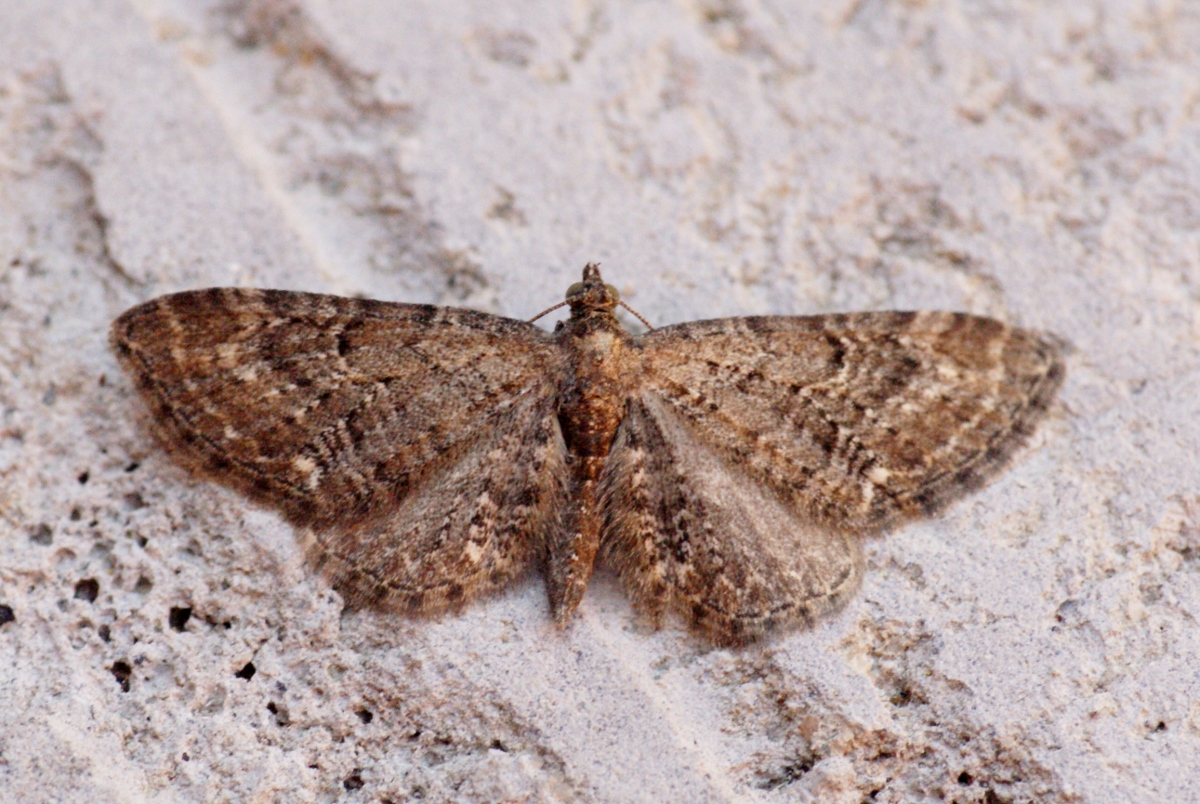

Conservation status
- Least Concern (IUCN 3.1)

Scientific classification
- Kingdom: Animalia
- Phylum: Arthropoda
- Clade: Pancrustacea
- Class: Insecta
- Order: Lepidoptera
- Family: Geometridae
- Genus: Eupithecia
- Species: E. vulgata

Binomial name
- Eupithecia vulgata (Haworth, 1809)

Synonyms
- Phalaena vulgata Haworth, 1809; Eupithecia lepsaria Staudinger, 1882; Eupithecia atropicta Dietze, 1910; Eupithecia austeraria Herrich-Schaffer, 1848; Geometra clusterata Hubner, 1813; Eupithecia cyrneata Schawerda, 1933; Phalaena pygmaeata Borkhausen, 1794

= Common pug =

Species of moth

The common pug (Eupithecia vulgata) is a moth of the family Geometridae. It is a common species across the Palearctic region, including the Near East and North Africa. It ranges from the Atlantic coast of Ireland and Portugal across Europe, the Middle East and Central Asia to the Russian Far East (Priamurje) and Korea.

== Description ==
The wingspan is 18–21 mm. The ground colour of the forewings is very variable – brown to fuscous, with a reddish tinge, ochreous, or whitish. The darker fuscous striae are angulated and the postmedian line is biangulate. The posterior edge of the median band is marked with black, the subterminal line is interrupted into whitish dots and a small white tornal mark. The forewings have either a minute dark discal mark or are without a discal mark. Forewings with a crescentic pale tornal stain. The hindwings are similar to the forewings but less conspicuously patterned. See also Prout. The larva is naked, long and slender, greyish green or light brown, on its back with a variety of rhomboid, darker spots. The reddish brown pupa has olive green wing sheaths. At the pointed cremaster there are eight hook bristles.

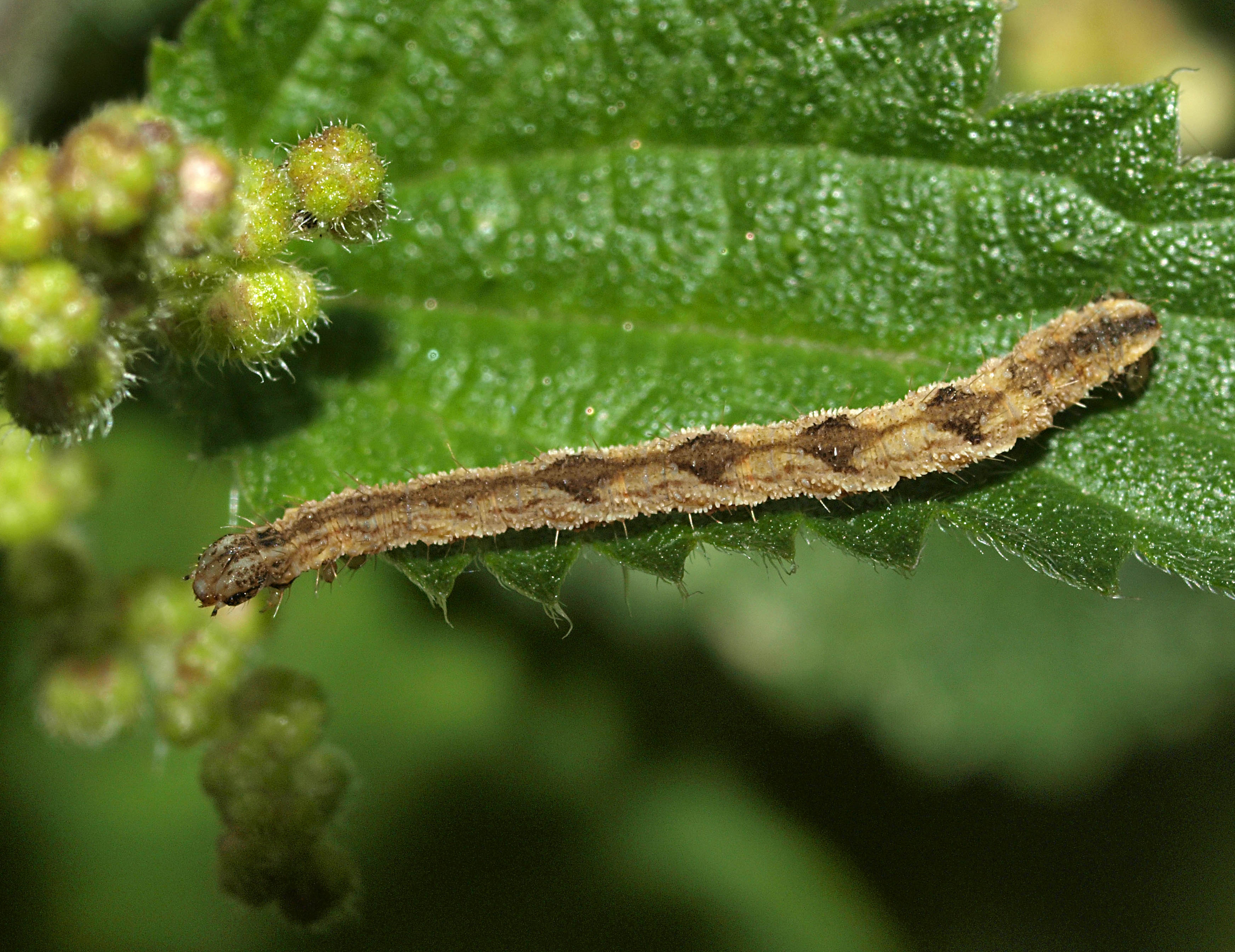
Larva on stinging nettle

Two broods are produced each year with adults on the wing in May and June and again in August. The species flies at night and is attracted to light. It colonizes a variety of different habitats, such as forest edges, bushes, hedges, embankments and plant corridors as well as gardens and parks. The occurrence in the Alps reaches up to 1,500 metres (4,920 ft).

The larvae feed on a variety of plants (see list below). The species overwinters as a pupa.

== Larval food plants ==
- Achillea – yarrow
- Artemisia
- Campanula – harebell
- Centaurea
- Crataegus – hawthorn
- Galium – bedstraw
- Salix – willow
- Senecio – ragwort
- Solidago – goldenrod
- Vaccinium – bilberry

== Subspecies ==
- Eupithecia vulgata vulgata
- Eupithecia vulgata clarensis Huggins, 1962 Ireland
- Eupithecia vulgata lepsaria Staudinger, 1882 Kazakhstan
- Eupithecia vulgata scotica Cockayne, 1951 Scotland
