= Phyllonorycter tridentatae =

Scientific classification
- Domain: Eukaryota
- Kingdom: Animalia
- Phylum: Arthropoda
- Class: Insecta
- Order: Lepidoptera
- Family: Gracillariidae
- Genus: Phyllonorycter
- Species: P. tridentatae

Binomial name
- Phyllonorycter tridentatae A. & Z. Lastuvka, 2006

Species of moth

Phyllonorycter tridentatae is a moth of the family Gracillariidae. It is known from the Iberian Peninsula.

The larvae feed on Chamaespartium tridentatum. They probably mine the leaves of their host plant.
