= Phyllonorycter adenocarpi =

Scientific classification
- Domain: Eukaryota
- Kingdom: Animalia
- Phylum: Arthropoda
- Class: Insecta
- Order: Lepidoptera
- Family: Gracillariidae
- Genus: Phyllonorycter
- Species: P. adenocarpi

Binomial name
- Phyllonorycter adenocarpi (Staudinger, 1863)

Synonyms
- Lithocolletis adenocarpi Staudinger, 1863

Species of moth

Phyllonorycter adenocarpi is a moth of the family Gracillariidae. It is known from the Iberian Peninsula.

The wingspan is about 8 mm. Adults are on wing in May and August in two generations in western Europe.

The larvae feed on Adenocarpus hispanicus. They mine the leaves of their host plant.
