= Eupithecia unitaria =

Scientific classification
- Domain: Eukaryota
- Kingdom: Animalia
- Phylum: Arthropoda
- Class: Insecta
- Order: Lepidoptera
- Family: Geometridae
- Genus: Eupithecia
- Species: E. unitaria

Binomial name
- Eupithecia unitaria Herrich-Schäffer, 1852

Synonyms
- Cidaria roseocinnamomaria Rothschild, 1914

Species of moth

Eupithecia unitaria is a moth in the family Geometridae. It is found in Spain and North Africa.

== Subspecies ==
- Eupithecia unitaria unitaria
- Eupithecia unitaria desertorum Dietze, 1910
