= Phyllonorycter erinaceae =

Scientific classification
- Domain: Eukaryota
- Kingdom: Animalia
- Phylum: Arthropoda
- Class: Insecta
- Order: Lepidoptera
- Family: Gracillariidae
- Genus: Phyllonorycter
- Species: P. erinaceae

Binomial name
- Phyllonorycter erinaceae Lastuvka & Lastuvka, 2013

Species of moth

Phyllonorycter erinaceae is a moth of the family Gracillariidae. It is found in Spain.

The wingspan is 9.2–10 mm. Adults have been recorded on wing from June to July, probably in one generation per year.
