= Dichomeris castellana =

Scientific classification
- Domain: Eukaryota
- Kingdom: Animalia
- Phylum: Arthropoda
- Class: Insecta
- Order: Lepidoptera
- Family: Gelechiidae
- Genus: Dichomeris
- Species: D. castellana

Binomial name
- Dichomeris castellana (A. Schmidt, 1941)

Synonyms
- Nothris castellana A. Schmidt, 1941

Species of moth

Dichomeris castellana is a moth of the family Gelechiidae. It is found in Spain.

== Literature ==
First description: Schmidt, A. (1941): New Spanish microlepidoptera. - Boletín de la Real Sociedad Española de Historia Natural 38: 37-39
