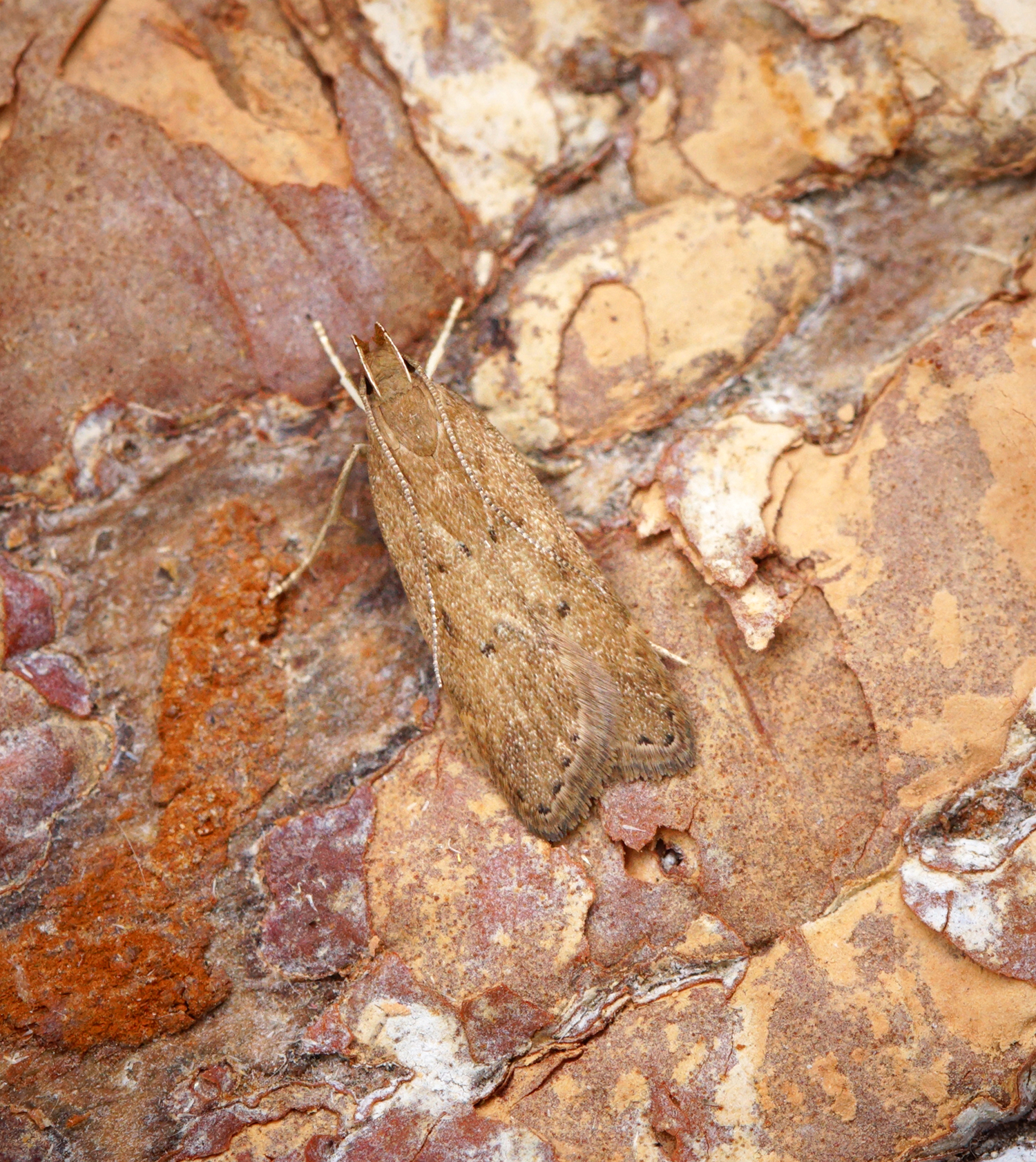

Scientific classification
- Domain: Eukaryota
- Kingdom: Animalia
- Phylum: Arthropoda
- Class: Insecta
- Order: Lepidoptera
- Family: Gelechiidae
- Genus: Helcystogramma
- Species: H. lutatella

Binomial name
- Helcystogramma lutatella (Herrich-Schäffer, 1854)

Synonyms
- Anacampsis lutatella Herrich-Schäffer, 1854; Onebala lutatella Herrich-Schäffer, 1854

= Helcystogramma lutatella =

Species of moth

Helcystogramma lutatella, the clay crest, is a moth in the family Gelechiidae. It was described by Gottlieb August Wilhelm Herrich-Schäffer in 1854. It is found in Uralsk, Transbaikalia, China (Fujian, Gansu, Guizhou, Hebei, Heilongjiang, Henan, Hubei, Jiangxi, Shaanxi, Sichuan, Xizang, Xinjiang) and almost all of Europe.

The wingspan is 12–18 mm. The forewings are yellowish brown with rounded brown spots at the middle and near the end of the cell as well as at three-fifths length of the fold. These spots are margined with yellowish white. Adults are on wing from July to early September in western Europe.

The larvae feed on Calamagrostis epigeios, Dactylis glomerata, Phragmites australis and Elymus repens.
