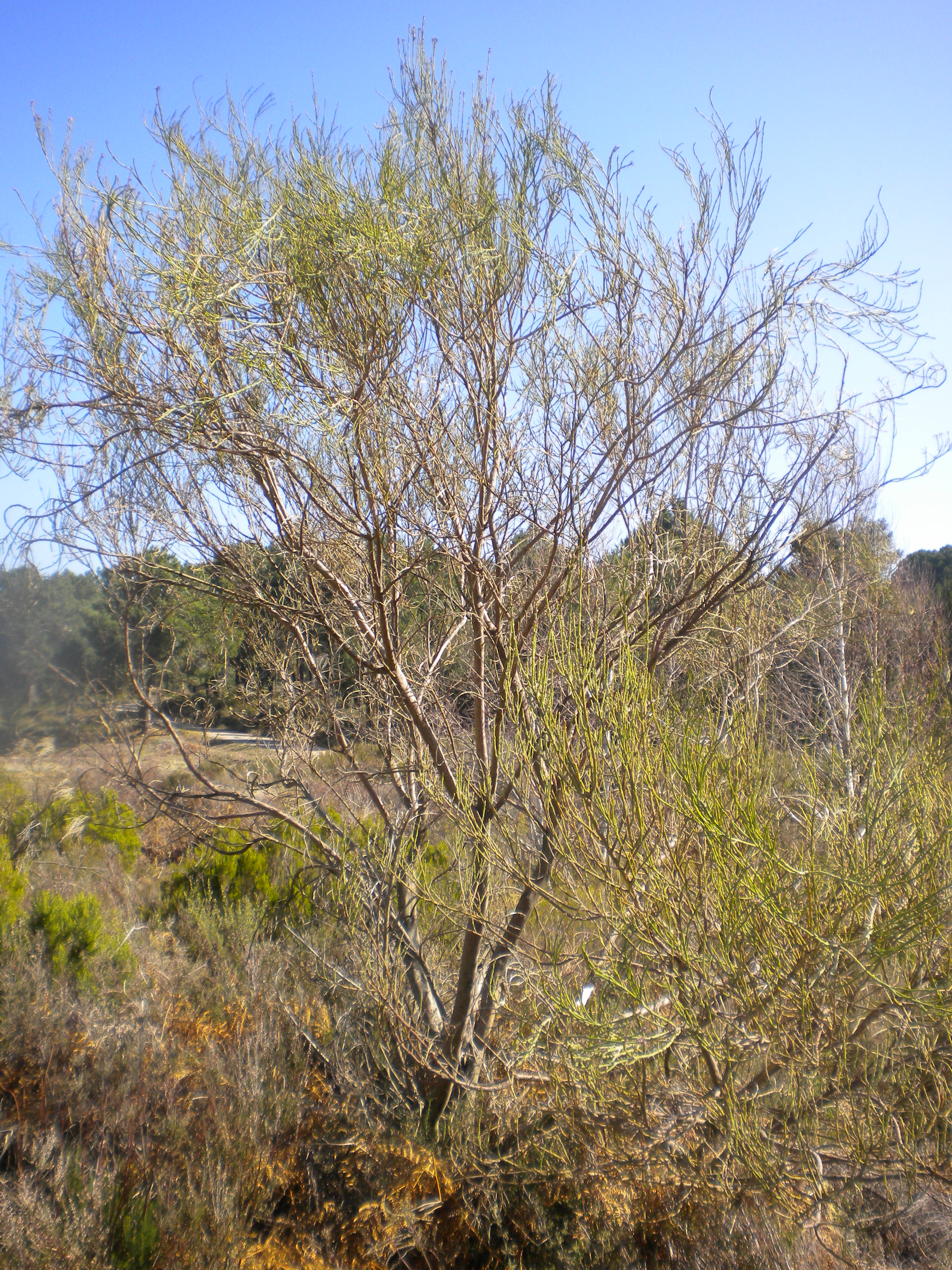

Scientific classification
- Kingdom: Plantae
- Clade: Tracheophytes
- Clade: Angiosperms
- Clade: Eudicots
- Clade: Rosids
- Order: Fabales
- Family: Fabaceae
- Subfamily: Faboideae
- Genus: Genista
- Species: G. florida

Binomial name
- Genista florida L.

= Genista florida =

Floriferous Greenweed

Species of flowering plant

Genista florida, the floriferous greenweed, is a species of flowering plant belonging to the family Fabaceae.

== Description ==
Very branched shrub that can reach up to 3 m. The stems have 8 to 10 slightly hairy T-shaped ribs. Leaves alternate entire, with a single lanceolate leaflet and stipulate. Flowers in clusters of up to 30 yellow florets. Flowers from May to July. Pod-shaped fruit with up to 6 seeds.

== Distribution and habitat ==
It grows in degraded forests, clearings and heaths, in most of the Iberian Peninsula. It prefers dry, acid and nitrogen-poor soils. Resists cold weather well.

== Taxonomy ==
Genista florida was described by Carl Nilsson Linnæus and published in Systema Naturae, Editio Decima 2: 1157. 1759.

Cytology

Chromosome number of Genista florida (Fam. Leguminosae) and infraspecific taxa: n=24; 2n=48.

Etymology

Genista: generic name from Latin. The Plantagenet kings and queens of England took their name from it: Genesta plant or genest plant, in allusion to a story that states that, when William the Conqueror embarked for England, he plucked a plant that was tenaciously clinging to a rock and put it in his helmet as a symbol of his own tenacity in his risky task. The plant was called the genista plant in Latin. This is a good story, but unfortunately William the Conqueror came long before the Plantagenets and it was actually Geoffrey of Anjou who was nicknamed the Plantagenet, because he wore a sprig of yellow broom flowers on his helmet as a badge (genêt is the French name for the broom bush), and it was his son, Henry II, who became the first Plantagenet king. Other historical explanations are that Geoffrey planted this shrub as a hunting cover or that he used it to whip himself. It was not until Richard of York, the father of both kings Edward IV and Richard III, that members of this family adopted the name Plantagenet, and then it was retroactively applied to the descendants of Geoffrey I of Anjou as the dynastic name.

florida: Latin epithet meaning "with flowers".

Synonymy

- Genista leptoclada Spach
- Genista polygalifolia DC.
- Genista polygaliphylla Brot.

== Common names ==
Spanish: abulaga, apiorno, aulaga, bereza, bolaga (2), canillero, cayomba, chinestra, escoba (4), escoba blanca, escoba serraniega, escoba verde (2), escobón (7), espiorno (2), flor de teñir portuguesa, flor de tintoreros (2), genista (3), ginesta pequeña, ispiorno, peorno (3), pierno, piornal, piornera, piorno (16), piorno albar, piorno amarillo, piorno blanco, piorno dos tintureiros, piornu (2), piornu albar (2), piornu morisco (2), retama (6), retama blanca (9), retamón, trampas, xiniesta (2), zusca (in parentheses is the number of species with the same name in Spain).
