= Scrobipalpa tristrigata =

Scientific classification
- Kingdom: Animalia
- Phylum: Arthropoda
- Class: Insecta
- Order: Lepidoptera
- Family: Gelechiidae
- Genus: Scrobipalpa
- Species: S. tristrigata

Binomial name
- Scrobipalpa tristrigata (Meyrick, 1938)

Synonyms
- Phthorimaea tristrigata Meyrick, 1938

Species of moth

Scrobipalpa tristrigata is a moth in the family Gelechiidae. It was described by Edward Meyrick in 1938. It is found in Orientale Province of the Democratic Republic of the Congo.
