= Scrobipalpa caucasica =

Scientific classification
- Kingdom: Animalia
- Phylum: Arthropoda
- Clade: Pancrustacea
- Class: Insecta
- Order: Lepidoptera
- Family: Gelechiidae
- Genus: Scrobipalpa
- Species: S. caucasica

Binomial name
- Scrobipalpa caucasica (Povolný, 2001)

Synonyms
- Euscrobipalpa caucasica Povolný, 2001; Euscrobipalpa bezengensis Povolný, 2001

Species of moth

Scrobipalpa caucasica is a moth in the family Gelechiidae. It was described by Povolný in 2001. The moth is found in the northern Caucasus.
