= Scrobipalpa sibila =

Scientific classification
- Kingdom: Animalia
- Phylum: Arthropoda
- Class: Insecta
- Order: Lepidoptera
- Family: Gelechiidae
- Genus: Scrobipalpa
- Species: S. sibila

Binomial name
- Scrobipalpa sibila (Meyrick, 1921)

Synonyms
- Phthorimaea sibila Meyrick, 1921

Species of moth

Scrobipalpa sibila is a moth in the family Gelechiidae. It was described by Edward Meyrick in 1921. It is found in Mozambique.

The wingspan is 11–12 mm (0.43–0.47 in). The forewings are ochreous whitish, with some faint pale ochreous suffusion forming streaks posteriorly. There is a faint pale grey suffusion with scattered dark grey specks forming very indefinite markings, consisting of a streak along the basal fourth of the costa, a spot beneath the apex of this, a spot on the fold towards the base, another larger on the middle of the fold, an oblique patch from the middle of the costa, some irregular marbling posteriorly in the disc, a spot on the middle of the termen, and an apical patch, all irregular and indistinct. The plical stigma is formed of dark fuscous sprinkles, the second discal similar, placed towards the tornus. The hindwings are grey whitish.
