= Scrobipalpa consueta =

Scientific classification
- Domain: Eukaryota
- Kingdom: Animalia
- Phylum: Arthropoda
- Class: Insecta
- Order: Lepidoptera
- Family: Gelechiidae
- Genus: Scrobipalpa
- Species: S. consueta

Binomial name
- Scrobipalpa consueta (Braun, 1925)

Synonyms
- Gnorimoschema consueta Braun, 1925

Species of moth

Scrobipalpa consueta is a moth in the family Gelechiidae. It was described by Annette Frances Braun in 1925. It is found in North America, where it has been recorded from Utah and Idaho.
