= Scrobipalpa helmuti =

Scientific classification
- Kingdom: Animalia
- Phylum: Arthropoda
- Clade: Pancrustacea
- Class: Insecta
- Order: Lepidoptera
- Family: Gelechiidae
- Genus: Scrobipalpa
- Species: S. helmuti

Binomial name
- Scrobipalpa helmuti Povolný, 1977

Species of moth

Scrobipalpa helmuti is a moth in the family Gelechiidae. It was described by Povolný in 1977. It is found in northern Iran.

The length of the forewings is about 5–5.8 mm (0.20–0.23 in).
