= Scrobipalpa confusa =

Scientific classification
- Kingdom: Animalia
- Phylum: Arthropoda
- Clade: Pancrustacea
- Class: Insecta
- Order: Lepidoptera
- Family: Gelechiidae
- Genus: Scrobipalpa
- Species: S. confusa

Binomial name
- Scrobipalpa confusa Povolný, 1966

Species of moth

Scrobipalpa confusa is a moth in the family Gelechiidae. It was described by Dalibor Povolný in 1966. The type locality is given as "Syria, Taurus, Marasch", in what today is Turkey.

The length of the forewings is about 5 mm (0.20 in). The ground colour of the forewings is whitish. The hindwings are milky white.
