= Scrobipalpa richteri =

Scientific classification
- Kingdom: Animalia
- Phylum: Arthropoda
- Clade: Pancrustacea
- Class: Insecta
- Order: Lepidoptera
- Family: Gelechiidae
- Genus: Scrobipalpa
- Species: S. richteri

Binomial name
- Scrobipalpa richteri Povolný, 1968

Synonyms
- Scrobipalpa viettei Povolný, 1971; Scrobipalpa richteri viettei Povolný, 1971

Species of moth

Scrobipalpa richteri is a moth in the family Gelechiidae. It was described by Dalibor Povolný in 1968. It is found in Iran and Tunisia. The Tunisian record can be recognized as the subspecies Scrobipalpa richteri viettei.

The length of the forewings is 4–5 mm (0.16–0.20 in). There are three dark brown-bordered marks on the forewings. The hindwings are dirty whitish.
