= Scrobipalpa intima =

Scientific classification
- Kingdom: Animalia
- Phylum: Arthropoda
- Clade: Pancrustacea
- Class: Insecta
- Order: Lepidoptera
- Family: Gelechiidae
- Genus: Scrobipalpa
- Species: S. intima

Binomial name
- Scrobipalpa intima (Povolný, 2001)

Synonyms
- Euscrobipalpa intima Povolný, 2001

Species of moth

Scrobipalpa intima is a moth in the family Gelechiidae. It was described by Povolný in 2001. It is found in China (Hebei) and Russia (Chitinskaya oblast).
