= Scrobipalpa spumata =

Scientific classification
- Kingdom: Animalia
- Phylum: Arthropoda
- Clade: Pancrustacea
- Class: Insecta
- Order: Lepidoptera
- Family: Gelechiidae
- Genus: Scrobipalpa
- Species: S. spumata

Binomial name
- Scrobipalpa spumata (Povolný, 2001)

Synonyms
- Euscrobipalpa spumata Povolný, 2001

Species of moth

Scrobipalpa spumata is a moth in the family Gelechiidae. It was described by Povolný in 2001. It is found in Russia (the southern Ural Mountains and the Tuva Republic).
