= Scrobipalpa deluccae =

Scientific classification
- Kingdom: Animalia
- Phylum: Arthropoda
- Clade: Pancrustacea
- Class: Insecta
- Order: Lepidoptera
- Family: Gelechiidae
- Genus: Scrobipalpa
- Species: S. deluccae

Binomial name
- Scrobipalpa deluccae Povolný, 1966

Species of moth

Scrobipalpa deluccae is a moth in the family Gelechiidae. It was described by Dalibor Povolný in 1966. The moth is found in Lebanon and Syria. Sources differ as to whether it also occurs in Malta. The type series includes one specimen from Malta, collected by the eponymous Mr. de Lucca. This might be an error of some sort, and Malta is included in the range of this species in some databases but not in others.
