= Scrobipalpa chinensis =

Scientific classification
- Kingdom: Animalia
- Phylum: Arthropoda
- Clade: Pancrustacea
- Class: Insecta
- Order: Lepidoptera
- Family: Gelechiidae
- Genus: Scrobipalpa
- Species: S. chinensis

Binomial name
- Scrobipalpa chinensis Povolný, 1969

Synonyms
- Scrobipalpa (Euscrobipalpa) chinensis Povolný, 1969

Species of moth

Scrobipalpa chinensis is a moth in the family Gelechiidae. It was described by Povolný in 1969. It is found in China (Yunnan).

The length of the forewings is about 5.4 mm (0.21 in). The forewings are uniform graphite to brownish grey. The hindwings are shining grey.
