= Scrobipalpa diversa =

Scientific classification
- Domain: Eukaryota
- Kingdom: Animalia
- Phylum: Arthropoda
- Class: Insecta
- Order: Lepidoptera
- Family: Gelechiidae
- Genus: Scrobipalpa
- Species: S. diversa

Binomial name
- Scrobipalpa diversa (Janse, 1950)

Synonyms
- Aristotelia diversa Janse, 1950

Species of moth

Scrobipalpa diversa is a moth in the family Gelechiidae. It was described by Anthonie Johannes Theodorus Janse in 1950. It is found in Namibia.
