= Scrobipalpa biskrae =

Scientific classification
- Kingdom: Animalia
- Phylum: Arthropoda
- Clade: Pancrustacea
- Class: Insecta
- Order: Lepidoptera
- Family: Gelechiidae
- Genus: Scrobipalpa
- Species: S. biskrae

Binomial name
- Scrobipalpa biskrae Povolný, 1977

Species of moth

Scrobipalpa biskrae is a moth in the family Gelechiidae. It was described by Povolný in 1977. It is found in Mauritania.
