= Scrobipalpa manhunkai =

Scientific classification
- Kingdom: Animalia
- Phylum: Arthropoda
- Clade: Pancrustacea
- Class: Insecta
- Order: Lepidoptera
- Family: Gelechiidae
- Genus: Scrobipalpa
- Species: S. manhunkai

Binomial name
- Scrobipalpa manhunkai Povolný, 1979

Synonyms
- Scrobipalpa mahunkai

Species of moth

Scrobipalpa manhunkai is a moth in the family Gelechiidae. It was described by Povolný in 1979. It is found in Tunisia.
