= Scrobipalpa obscurus =

Scientific classification
- Kingdom: Animalia
- Phylum: Arthropoda
- Clade: Pancrustacea
- Class: Insecta
- Order: Lepidoptera
- Family: Gelechiidae
- Genus: Scrobipalpa
- Species: S. obscurus

Binomial name
- Scrobipalpa obscurus (Povolný, 1985)

Synonyms
- Scrobipalpoides obscurus Povolný, 1985

Species of moth

Scrobipalpa obscurus is a moth in the family Gelechiidae. It was described by Povolný in 1985. It is found in Argentina.
