= Scrobipalpa zagulajevi =

Scientific classification
- Kingdom: Animalia
- Phylum: Arthropoda
- Clade: Pancrustacea
- Class: Insecta
- Order: Lepidoptera
- Family: Gelechiidae
- Genus: Scrobipalpa
- Species: S. zagulajevi

Binomial name
- Scrobipalpa zagulajevi Lvovsky & Piskunov, 1989

Species of moth

Scrobipalpa zagulajevi is a moth in the family Gelechiidae. It was described by Alexandr L. Lvovsky and Vladimir I. Piskunov in 1989. It is found in Mongolia.
