= Scrobipalpa povolnyi =

Scientific classification
- Kingdom: Animalia
- Phylum: Arthropoda
- Clade: Pancrustacea
- Class: Insecta
- Order: Lepidoptera
- Family: Gelechiidae
- Genus: Scrobipalpa
- Species: S. povolnyi

Binomial name
- Scrobipalpa povolnyi Emelyanov & Piskunov, 1982

Species of moth

Scrobipalpa povolnyi is a moth in the family Gelechiidae. It was described by Emelyanov and Piskunov in 1982. It is found in Mongolia.
