= Scrobipalpa pyrrhanthes =

Scientific classification
- Kingdom: Animalia
- Phylum: Arthropoda
- Class: Insecta
- Order: Lepidoptera
- Family: Gelechiidae
- Genus: Scrobipalpa
- Species: S. pyrrhanthes

Binomial name
- Scrobipalpa pyrrhanthes (Meyrick, 1904)

Synonyms
- Gnorimoschema pyrrhanthes Meyrick, 1904; Gnorimoschema marina Meyrick, 1904; Gnorimoschema xerophylla Meyrick, 1904

Species of moth

Scrobipalpa pyrrhanthes is a moth in the family Gelechiidae. It was described by Edward Meyrick in 1904. It is found in Australia, where it has been recorded form New South Wales, Western Australia, and Victoria.

The wingspan is 8–9 mm (0.31–0.35 in). The forewings are whitish ochreous, irregularly sprinkled with dark fuscous, and somewhat mixed with ferruginous reddish. There are two spots of blackish sprinkles on the costa towards the base and two on the fold obliquely beyond these. The stigmata are blackish, surrounded with reddish ferruginous, the plical obliquely before the first discal. The hindwings are light grey.
