= Scrobipalpa concreta =

Scientific classification
- Kingdom: Animalia
- Phylum: Arthropoda
- Class: Insecta
- Order: Lepidoptera
- Family: Gelechiidae
- Genus: Scrobipalpa
- Species: S. concreta

Binomial name
- Scrobipalpa concreta (Meyrick, 1914)

Synonyms
- Phthorimaea concreta Meyrick, 1914

Species of moth

Scrobipalpa concreta is a moth in the family Gelechiidae. It was described by Edward Meyrick in 1914. It is found in South Africa and the former Orientale Province of the Democratic Republic of the Congo.

The wingspan is 15–16 mm (0.59–0.63 in). The forewings are whitish ochreous, sometimes slightly yellowish tinged, variably sprinkled with fuscous and dark fuscous specks, sometimes very slightly, sometimes tending to form several undefined small spots along the costa. There is a dark fuscous dot near the base in the middle, and one slightly beyond it beneath the costa. The stigmata are small, dark fuscous, the plical beneath the first discal. There are sometimes dots of dark fuscous sprinkles around the posterior part of the costa and termen. The hindwings are pale grey or whitish grey.
