= Scrobipalpa burmanni =

Scientific classification
- Kingdom: Animalia
- Phylum: Arthropoda
- Clade: Pancrustacea
- Class: Insecta
- Order: Lepidoptera
- Family: Gelechiidae
- Genus: Scrobipalpa
- Species: S. burmanni

Binomial name
- Scrobipalpa burmanni Povolný, 1971

Species of moth

Scrobipalpa burmanni is a moth in the family Gelechiidae. It was described by Dalibor Povolný in 1971. It is found in Tunisia.

The length of the forewings is 5.5–6.5 mm (0.22–0.26 in). The forewings range from light to dark brown. The hindwings are grey.
