= Scrobipalpa forsteri =

Scientific classification
- Kingdom: Animalia
- Phylum: Arthropoda
- Clade: Pancrustacea
- Class: Insecta
- Order: Lepidoptera
- Family: Gelechiidae
- Genus: Scrobipalpa
- Species: S. forsteri

Binomial name
- Scrobipalpa forsteri Povolný, 1971

Species of moth

Scrobipalpa forsteri is a moth in the family Gelechiidae. It was described by Dalibor Povolný in 1971. It is found in Tunisia.

The length of the forewings is 6–7.5 mm (0.24–0.30 in).
