= Scrobipalpa bahrainica =

Scientific classification
- Kingdom: Animalia
- Phylum: Arthropoda
- Clade: Pancrustacea
- Class: Insecta
- Order: Lepidoptera
- Family: Gelechiidae
- Genus: Scrobipalpa
- Species: S. bahrainica

Binomial name
- Scrobipalpa bahrainica Povolný, 1966

Species of moth

Scrobipalpa bahrainica is a moth in the family Gelechiidae. It was described by Dalibor Povolný in 1966. It is found in Bahrain and Iran.

The forewings are dirty white. The hindwings are silvery white.
