= Scrobipalpa leucocephala =

Scientific classification
- Domain: Eukaryota
- Kingdom: Animalia
- Phylum: Arthropoda
- Class: Insecta
- Order: Lepidoptera
- Family: Gelechiidae
- Genus: Scrobipalpa
- Species: S. leucocephala

Binomial name
- Scrobipalpa leucocephala (Lower, 1893)

Synonyms
- Gelechia leucocephala Lower, 1893; Gelechia perdita Lower, 1899; Gnorimoschema petrinodes Meyrick, 1904; Scrobipalpa atripennis Povolný, 1977; Scrobipalpa griseipennis Povolný, 1977; Scrobipalpa marmoreipennis Povolný, 1977; Scrobipalpa megalopennis Povolný, 1977

Species of moth

Scrobipalpa leucocephala is a moth in the family Gelechiidae. It was described by Oswald Bertram Lower in 1893. It is found in Australia, where it has been recorded form Queensland, New South Wales and South Australia.

The wingspan is 15–17 mm (0.59–0.67 in). The forewings are ochreous-whitish, irregularly and suffusedly irrorated with fuscous and dark fuscous and with two undefined darker costal spots towards the base, and two in the disc obliquely beyond these. The stigmata are dark fuscous and pale-edged, the plical obliquely before the first discal, placed in an elongate pale mark. There is a dark fuscous pale-edged dot obliquely near beyond and beneath the second discal and a pale angulated transverse shade at three-fourths more or less indicated. The hindwings are light grey, darker posteriorly.
