= Scrobipalpa meteorica =

Scientific classification
- Kingdom: Animalia
- Phylum: Arthropoda
- Clade: Pancrustacea
- Class: Insecta
- Order: Lepidoptera
- Family: Gelechiidae
- Genus: Scrobipalpa
- Species: S. meteorica

Binomial name
- Scrobipalpa meteorica Povolný, 1984

Species of moth

Scrobipalpa meteorica is a moth in the family Gelechiidae. It was described by Povolný in 1984. It is found in Asia Minor.

The grey forewings are about 5.9 mm (0.23 in) long. The hindwings are light grey with darker grey around the edges.
