= Scrobipalpa omachella =

Scientific classification
- Domain: Eukaryota
- Kingdom: Animalia
- Phylum: Arthropoda
- Class: Insecta
- Order: Lepidoptera
- Family: Gelechiidae
- Genus: Scrobipalpa
- Species: S. omachella

Binomial name
- Scrobipalpa omachella (Oberthür, 1888)

Synonyms
- Teleia omachella Oberthür, 1888

Species of moth

Scrobipalpa omachella is a moth in the family Gelechiidae. It was described by Charles Oberthür in 1888. It is found in North Africa.

The forewings are white with brownish markings. The hindwings are satin white.
