= Scrobipalpa nonyma =

Scientific classification
- Kingdom: Animalia
- Phylum: Arthropoda
- Class: Insecta
- Order: Lepidoptera
- Family: Gelechiidae
- Genus: Scrobipalpa
- Species: S. nonyma

Binomial name
- Scrobipalpa nonyma (Turner, 1919)

Synonyms
- Phithorimaea nonyma Turner, 1919

Species of moth

Scrobipalpa nonyma is a moth in the family Gelechiidae. It was described by Turner in 1919. It is found in Australia, where it has been recorded from Victoria.

The wingspan is about 12 mm (0.47 in). The forewings are whitish-brown with a few fuscous scales towards the apex. The stigmata are fuscous, the first discal before the middle, the second discal beyond the middle, the plical beneath the first discal. The hindwings are whitish.
