= Scrobipalpa distincta =

Scientific classification
- Domain: Eukaryota
- Kingdom: Animalia
- Phylum: Arthropoda
- Class: Insecta
- Order: Lepidoptera
- Family: Gelechiidae
- Genus: Scrobipalpa
- Species: S. distincta

Binomial name
- Scrobipalpa distincta Bidzilya & Li, 2010

Species of moth

Scrobipalpa distincta is a moth in the family Gelechiidae. It was described by Oleksiy V. Bidzilya and Hou-Hun Li in 2010. It is found in China in Gansu, Ningxia and Henan.

== Etymology ==
The species name refers to the distinctive genitalia and external characters of the new species and is derived from Latin distinctus (meaning separate, different).
