= Scrobipalpa strictella =

Scientific classification
- Domain: Eukaryota
- Kingdom: Animalia
- Phylum: Arthropoda
- Class: Insecta
- Order: Lepidoptera
- Family: Gelechiidae
- Genus: Scrobipalpa
- Species: S. strictella

Binomial name
- Scrobipalpa strictella Bidzilya & Li, 2010

Species of moth

Scrobipalpa strictella is a moth in the family Gelechiidae. It was described by Oleksiy V. Bidzilya and Hou-Hun Li in 2010. It is found in Hebei, China.

The wingspan is 10–11 mm (0.39–0.43 in). Adults are on wing at the end of June and in early August.

== Etymology ==
The species name refers to the narrow sacculus and vinculum processes in the male genitalia and is derived from Latin strictus (meaning narrow).
