= Scrobipalpa nigripuncta =

Scientific classification
- Domain: Eukaryota
- Kingdom: Animalia
- Phylum: Arthropoda
- Class: Insecta
- Order: Lepidoptera
- Family: Gelechiidae
- Genus: Scrobipalpa
- Species: S. nigripuncta

Binomial name
- Scrobipalpa nigripuncta Bidzilya & Li, 2010

Species of moth

Scrobipalpa nigripuncta is a moth in the family Gelechiidae. It was described by Oleksiy V. Bidzilya and Hou-Hun Li in 2010. It is found in Henan, China.

Adults are on wing in May.

== Etymology ==
The species name refers to the wing pattern and is derived from the Latin prefix nigr- (meaning black) and Latin punctus (meaning small spot).
