= Scrobipalpa sinica =

Scientific classification
- Kingdom: Animalia
- Phylum: Arthropoda
- Class: Insecta
- Order: Lepidoptera
- Family: Gelechiidae
- Genus: Scrobipalpa
- Species: S. sinica

Binomial name
- Scrobipalpa sinica Bidzilya & Li, 2010

Species of moth

Scrobipalpa sinica is a moth in the family Gelechiidae. It was described by Oleksiy V. Bidzilya and Hou-Hun Li in 2010. It is found in China (Inner Mongolia) and Mongolia.

The wingspan is 11–12 mm (0.43–0.47 in). Adults are on wing in August.

== Etymology ==
The species name refers to the distribution of the species.
