= Scrobipalpa candicans =

Scientific classification
- Kingdom: Animalia
- Phylum: Arthropoda
- Clade: Pancrustacea
- Class: Insecta
- Order: Lepidoptera
- Family: Gelechiidae
- Genus: Scrobipalpa
- Species: S. candicans

Binomial name
- Scrobipalpa candicans (Povolný, 1996)

Synonyms
- Ilseopsis (Euscrobipalpa) candicans Povolný, 1996

Species of moth

Scrobipalpa candicans is a moth in the family Gelechiidae. It was described by Povolný in 1996. It is found in China (Xinjiang), Kyrgyzstan and south-eastern Kazakhstan.
