= Scrobipalpa biljurshi =

Scientific classification
- Kingdom: Animalia
- Phylum: Arthropoda
- Clade: Pancrustacea
- Class: Insecta
- Order: Lepidoptera
- Family: Gelechiidae
- Genus: Scrobipalpa
- Species: S. biljurshi

Binomial name
- Scrobipalpa biljurshi Povolný, 1980

Species of moth

Scrobipalpa biljurshi is a moth in the family Gelechiidae. It was described by Povolný in 1980. It is found in Saudi Arabia.
