= Scrobipalpa griseofusella =

Scientific classification
- Kingdom: Animalia
- Phylum: Arthropoda
- Class: Insecta
- Order: Lepidoptera
- Family: Gelechiidae
- Genus: Scrobipalpa
- Species: S. griseofusella

Binomial name
- Scrobipalpa griseofusella (Toll, 1947)

Synonyms
- Lita griseofusella Toll, 1947

Species of moth

Scrobipalpa griseofusella is a moth in the family Gelechiidae. It was described by Sergiusz Toll in 1947. It is found in northern Iran.

The length of the forewings is about 6.8 mm (0.27 in).
