= Scrobipalpa meyricki =

Scientific classification
- Kingdom: Animalia
- Phylum: Arthropoda
- Clade: Pancrustacea
- Class: Insecta
- Order: Lepidoptera
- Family: Gelechiidae
- Genus: Scrobipalpa
- Species: S. meyricki

Binomial name
- Scrobipalpa meyricki Povolný, 1971

Species of moth

Scrobipalpa meyricki is a moth in the family Gelechiidae. It was described by Dalibor Povolný in 1971. It is found in Algeria and Tunisia.

The length of the forewings is 5.5–6 mm (0.22–0.24 in). There are brownish to ash-grey dark-tipped scales on the forewings. The hindwings are dirty whitish. The larval food plant is unknown but could be Atriplex halimus (Amaranthaceae).
