= Scrobipalpa zouhari =

Scientific classification
- Kingdom: Animalia
- Phylum: Arthropoda
- Clade: Pancrustacea
- Class: Insecta
- Order: Lepidoptera
- Family: Gelechiidae
- Genus: Scrobipalpa
- Species: S. zouhari

Binomial name
- Scrobipalpa zouhari Povolný, 1984

Species of moth

Scrobipalpa zouhari is a moth in the family Gelechiidae. It was described by Povolný in 1984. It is found in China (Beijing).

The length of the forewings about 6.1 mm (0.24 in). The hindwings are dirty whitish.
