= Scrobipalpa disjectella =

Scientific classification
- Domain: Eukaryota
- Kingdom: Animalia
- Phylum: Arthropoda
- Class: Insecta
- Order: Lepidoptera
- Family: Gelechiidae
- Genus: Scrobipalpa
- Species: S. disjectella

Binomial name
- Scrobipalpa disjectella (Staudinger, 1859)

Synonyms
- Gelechia disjectella Staudinger, 1859; Lita disjectella var. tridentella Chrétien, 1917

Species of moth

Scrobipalpa disjectella is a moth in the family Gelechiidae. It was described by Staudinger in 1859. It is found in Algeria, Spain and Kyrgyzstan.

The wingspan is 12–14 mm (0.47–0.55 in). The forewings are whitish-grey with a broad dark longitudinal shade, with an ochreous-yellow base. There are also two black stripes and a dark dot at the tip.

The larvae feed on Artemisia barrelieri.
