= Scrobipalpa halimifolia =

Scientific classification
- Domain: Eukaryota
- Kingdom: Animalia
- Phylum: Arthropoda
- Class: Insecta
- Order: Lepidoptera
- Family: Gelechiidae
- Genus: Scrobipalpa
- Species: S. halimifolia

Binomial name
- Scrobipalpa halimifolia Bidzilya & Budashkin, 2011

Species of moth

Scrobipalpa halimifolia is a moth in the family Gelechiidae. It was described by Oleksiy V. Bidzilya and Yury I. Budashkin in 2011. It is found on the Crimea.

The larvae probably feed on Halimione verrucifera. They mine the leaves of their host plant.
