= Scrobipalpa extensa =

Scientific classification
- Kingdom: Animalia
- Phylum: Arthropoda
- Clade: Pancrustacea
- Class: Insecta
- Order: Lepidoptera
- Family: Gelechiidae
- Genus: Scrobipalpa
- Species: S. extensa

Binomial name
- Scrobipalpa extensa Povolný, 1969

Species of moth

Scrobipalpa extensa is a moth in the family Gelechiidae. It was described by Povolný in 1969. It is found in Afghanistan.

The length of the forewings is about 5.5 mm (0.22 in). The forewings are covered by mixed light brownish and darkened scales. The hindwings are grey.
