= Scrobipalpa deutschi =

Scientific classification
- Kingdom: Animalia
- Phylum: Arthropoda
- Clade: Pancrustacea
- Class: Insecta
- Order: Lepidoptera
- Family: Gelechiidae
- Genus: Scrobipalpa
- Species: S. deutschi

Binomial name
- Scrobipalpa deutschi Huemer & Karsholt, 2010

Species of moth

Scrobipalpa deutschi is a moth in the family Gelechiidae. It was described by Peter Huemer and Ole Karsholt in 2010. It is found in Algeria and the southern Ural Mountains.

The wingspan is about 14.5 mm (0.57 in).
