= Scrobipalpa peterseni =

Scientific classification
- Kingdom: Animalia
- Phylum: Arthropoda
- Clade: Pancrustacea
- Class: Insecta
- Order: Lepidoptera
- Family: Gelechiidae
- Genus: Scrobipalpa
- Species: S. peterseni

Binomial name
- Scrobipalpa peterseni (Povolný, 1965)

Synonyms
- Ilseopsis peterseni Povolný, 1965

Species of moth

Scrobipalpa peterseni is a moth in the family Gelechiidae. It was described by Povolný in 1965. It is found in Algeria, Tunisia, on Sicily and in Saudi Arabia.

The length of the forewings is 4.6–5.1 mm (0.18–0.20 in). The forewing margins are whitish brown to brown. The hindwings are dirty whitish.
