= Scrobipalpa ochromaculata =

Scientific classification
- Domain: Eukaryota
- Kingdom: Animalia
- Phylum: Arthropoda
- Class: Insecta
- Order: Lepidoptera
- Family: Gelechiidae
- Genus: Scrobipalpa
- Species: S. ochromaculata

Binomial name
- Scrobipalpa ochromaculata (D. Lucas, 1950)

Synonyms
- Phthorimaea ochromaculata D. Lucas, 1950

Species of moth

Scrobipalpa ochromaculata is a moth in the family Gelechiidae. It was described by Daniel Lucas in 1950. It is found in Tunisia.
