= Scrobipalpa picta =

Scientific classification
- Kingdom: Animalia
- Phylum: Arthropoda
- Clade: Pancrustacea
- Class: Insecta
- Order: Lepidoptera
- Family: Gelechiidae
- Genus: Scrobipalpa
- Species: S. picta

Binomial name
- Scrobipalpa picta Povolný, 1969

Synonyms
- Scrobipalpa (Euscrobipalpa) picta Povolný, 1969

Species of moth

Scrobipalpa picta is a moth in the family Gelechiidae. It was described by Povolný in 1969. It is found in Afghanistan.

The length of the forewings is 5.2–5.8 mm (0.20–0.23 in).
