= Scrobipalpa albostriata =

Scientific classification
- Kingdom: Animalia
- Phylum: Arthropoda
- Clade: Pancrustacea
- Class: Insecta
- Order: Lepidoptera
- Family: Gelechiidae
- Genus: Scrobipalpa
- Species: S. albostriata

Binomial name
- Scrobipalpa albostriata Povolný, 1977

Species of moth

Scrobipalpa albostriata is a moth in the family Gelechiidae. It was described by Povolný in 1977. It is found in northern Iran.

The length of the forewings is about 5.5 mm (0.22 in). The forewings are blackish with a light brownish tinge and white stripes. The hindwings are grey.
