= Scrobipalpa felixi =

Scientific classification
- Kingdom: Animalia
- Phylum: Arthropoda
- Clade: Pancrustacea
- Class: Insecta
- Order: Lepidoptera
- Family: Gelechiidae
- Genus: Scrobipalpa
- Species: S. felixi

Binomial name
- Scrobipalpa felixi Povolný, 1978

Species of moth

Scrobipalpa felixi is a moth in the family Gelechiidae. It was described by Povolný in 1978. It is found in Mongolia.
