= Scrobipalpa pustovarovi =

Scientific classification
- Kingdom: Animalia
- Phylum: Arthropoda
- Clade: Pancrustacea
- Class: Insecta
- Order: Lepidoptera
- Family: Gelechiidae
- Genus: Scrobipalpa
- Species: S. pustovarovi

Binomial name
- Scrobipalpa pustovarovi Piskunov, 1990

Species of moth

Scrobipalpa pustovarovi is a moth in the family Gelechiidae. It was described by Piskunov in 1990. It is found in Mongolia.
