= Scrobipalpa lagodes =

Scientific classification
- Kingdom: Animalia
- Phylum: Arthropoda
- Class: Insecta
- Order: Lepidoptera
- Family: Gelechiidae
- Genus: Scrobipalpa
- Species: S. lagodes

Binomial name
- Scrobipalpa lagodes (Meyrick, 1926)

Synonyms
- Phthorimaea lagodes Meyrick, 1926

Species of moth

Scrobipalpa lagodes is a moth in the family Gelechiidae. It was described by Edward Meyrick in 1926. It is found in northern Kazakhstan.

The wingspan is 12–13 mm (0.47–0.51 in). The forewings are yellow brownish, slightly speckled with fuscous or whitish. The hindwings are light blue grey, thinly scaled.

The larvae feed on Atriplex cana.
