= Scrobipalpa saltans =

Scientific classification
- Domain: Eukaryota
- Kingdom: Animalia
- Phylum: Arthropoda
- Class: Insecta
- Order: Lepidoptera
- Family: Gelechiidae
- Genus: Scrobipalpa
- Species: S. saltans

Binomial name
- Scrobipalpa saltans Wakeham-Dawson, 2012

Species of moth

Scrobipalpa saltans is a moth in the family Gelechiidae. It was described by Wakeham-Dawson in 2012. It is found on the Falkland Islands.

== Etymology ==
The species name refers to its jumping habit and is derived from Latin saltans.
