= Scrobipalpa skulei =

Scientific classification
- Kingdom: Animalia
- Phylum: Arthropoda
- Clade: Pancrustacea
- Class: Insecta
- Order: Lepidoptera
- Family: Gelechiidae
- Genus: Scrobipalpa
- Species: S. skulei

Binomial name
- Scrobipalpa skulei Huemer & Karsholt, 2010

Species of moth

Scrobipalpa skulei is a moth in the family Gelechiidae. It was described by Peter Huemer and Ole Karsholt in 2010. It is found in Slovenia.

== Etymology ==
The species is named from Bjarne E. Skule who collected valuable material of Gelechiidae during the last decades.
