= Scrobipalpa atriplex =

Scientific classification
- Kingdom: Animalia
- Phylum: Arthropoda
- Class: Insecta
- Order: Lepidoptera
- Family: Gelechiidae
- Genus: Scrobipalpa
- Species: S. atriplex

Binomial name
- Scrobipalpa atriplex (Busck, 1910)

Synonyms
- Gnorimoschema atriplex Busck, 1910; Euscrobipalpa atriplex

Species of moth

Scrobipalpa atriplex is a moth in the family Gelechiidae. It was described by August Busck in 1910. It is found in North America, where it has been recorded from California.

The length of the forewings is about 15 mm (0.59 in). The second joint of the labial palpi is light ochreous suffused with somewhat deeper ochreous and sparsely sprinkled with black scales. The black dusting is irregular, densest along the costal edge and on the tip of the wing and forming three or four small blackish dots on the middle of the wing. The hindwings are ochreous white.

The larvae feed on Atriplex canescens.
