= Scrobipalpa parvipulex =

Scientific classification
- Domain: Eukaryota
- Kingdom: Animalia
- Phylum: Arthropoda
- Class: Insecta
- Order: Lepidoptera
- Family: Gelechiidae
- Genus: Scrobipalpa
- Species: S. parvipulex

Binomial name
- Scrobipalpa parvipulex (Walsingham, 1911)

Synonyms
- Lita parvipulex Walsingham, 1911

Species of moth

Scrobipalpa parvipulex is a moth in the family Gelechiidae. It was described by Walsingham in 1911. It is found in Algeria.

The wingspan is 8–11 mm (0.31–0.43 in). The forewings are creamy white, specked and spotted with dark umber-brown. There is a group of three spots forming a triangle at the base, two at half the wing-width, and a third, forming the apex, on the costa at about one-fourth. An oblique streak, apparently composed of two or more dark spots, descends obliquely outward from the costa, reaching to the fold, scarcely separated from its outer edge is another spot on the disc before the middle, and remote from this is another at the end of the cell, the costa being slightly shaded with umber-brown speckling above and before it. At the apex and along the termen is a shade of profuse umber-brown speckling, extending partially into the brownish grey cilia which become whitish about the apex. The hindwings are pale blue-grey.
