= Scrobipalpa arenaceariella =

Scientific classification
- Kingdom: Animalia
- Phylum: Arthropoda
- Clade: Pancrustacea
- Class: Insecta
- Order: Lepidoptera
- Family: Gelechiidae
- Genus: Scrobipalpa
- Species: S. arenaceariella

Binomial name
- Scrobipalpa arenaceariella (Powell & Povolný, 2001)

Synonyms
- Euscrobipalpa arenaceariella Powell & Povolný, 2001

Species of moth

Scrobipalpa arenaceariella is a moth in the family Gelechiidae. It was described by Powell and Povolný in 2001. It is found in North America, where it has been recorded from California.

The length of the forewings is 5.9–6.2 mm (0.23–0.24 in) for males and 5.1–6.2 mm (0.20–0.24 in) for females.
