= Scrobipalpa jariorum =

Scientific classification
- Kingdom: Animalia
- Phylum: Arthropoda
- Clade: Pancrustacea
- Class: Insecta
- Order: Lepidoptera
- Family: Gelechiidae
- Genus: Scrobipalpa
- Species: S. jariorum

Binomial name
- Scrobipalpa jariorum Huemer & Karsholt, 2010

Species of moth

Scrobipalpa jariorum is a moth in the family Gelechiidae. It was described by Peter Huemer and Ole Karsholt in 2010. It is found in Bulgaria.

== Description ==
The adult wingspan is 11–15 mm (0.43–0.59 in). Its head is white with some brown mottling around the neck. Its labial palpi are white and each has two faint black rings. The antennae have rings of black and white. The hindwings are light grey. The forewings are white with scattered black scales.

== Range ==
It has only been found in Bulgaria.
