= Scrobipalpa keredjensis =

Scientific classification
- Kingdom: Animalia
- Phylum: Arthropoda
- Clade: Pancrustacea
- Class: Insecta
- Order: Lepidoptera
- Family: Gelechiidae
- Genus: Scrobipalpa
- Species: S. keredjensis

Binomial name
- Scrobipalpa keredjensis Povolný, 1968

Species of moth

Scrobipalpa keredjensis is a moth in the family Gelechiidae. It was described by Povolný in 1968. It is found in Iran.
