= Scrobipalpa flavinerva =

Scientific classification
- Domain: Eukaryota
- Kingdom: Animalia
- Phylum: Arthropoda
- Class: Insecta
- Order: Lepidoptera
- Family: Gelechiidae
- Genus: Scrobipalpa
- Species: S. flavinerva

Binomial name
- Scrobipalpa flavinerva Bidzilya & Li, 2010

Species of moth

Scrobipalpa flavinerva is a moth in the family Gelechiidae. It was described by Oleksiy V. Bidzilya and Hou-Hun Li in 2010. It is found in the Chinese autonomous region of Inner Mongolia and in Mongolia.

The wingspan is 14–15 mm (0.55–0.59 in). The forewings are grey with the veins cream. The hindwings are light grey, with dark veins. Adults are on wing from the end of June to mid-August.

== Etymology ==
The species name refers to the wing pattern and is derived from Latin flavus (meaning yellow) and nervus (meaning vein).
