= Scrobipalpa delattini =

Scientific classification
- Kingdom: Animalia
- Phylum: Arthropoda
- Clade: Pancrustacea
- Class: Insecta
- Order: Lepidoptera
- Family: Gelechiidae
- Genus: Scrobipalpa
- Species: S. delattini

Binomial name
- Scrobipalpa delattini Povolný, 1969

Species of moth

Scrobipalpa delattini is a species of moth in the family Gelechiidae. It was described by Dalibor Povolný in 1969 from specimens collected at Abu Ghraib, near Baghdad, Iraq.

== Taxonomy ==
Scrobipalpa delattini was described by Dalibor Povolný in 1969 from three specimens in the collection of Prof. Dr. G. de Lattin at the Zoological Institute of the University of Saarland. Povolný dedicated the species to the late Prof. de Lattin.

== Description ==
Povolný described the adult as a medium-sized, distinctly marked species. The forewing length is 7–9 mm. The thorax, head and palps range from light clay-brown to dark chocolate-brown, while the hindwings are glossy whitish with fine brown-grey fringes.

== Type material ==
The holotype is a male collected by Reinhard Remane at Abu Ghraib, near Baghdad, Iraq, on 11 March 1958. Two paratypes, one male and one female, were collected at the same locality on 20 and 21 March 1958. All three specimens were taken by light trap and were deposited in the de Lattin collection at the Biogeographical Department of the University of Saarland, Saarbrücken.
