= Scrobipalpa algeriensis =

Scientific classification
- Kingdom: Animalia
- Phylum: Arthropoda
- Clade: Pancrustacea
- Class: Insecta
- Order: Lepidoptera
- Family: Gelechiidae
- Genus: Scrobipalpa
- Species: S. algeriensis

Binomial name
- Scrobipalpa algeriensis Povolný & Bradley, 1965

Species of moth

Scrobipalpa algeriensis is a moth in the family Gelechiidae. It was described by Povolný and Bradley in 1965. It is found in Morocco, Algeria, Tunisia and Spain.
