= Scrobipalpa subroseata =

Scientific classification
- Kingdom: Animalia
- Phylum: Arthropoda
- Class: Insecta
- Order: Lepidoptera
- Family: Gelechiidae
- Genus: Scrobipalpa
- Species: S. subroseata

Binomial name
- Scrobipalpa subroseata (Meyrick, 1932)

Synonyms
- Phthorimaea subroseata Meyrick, 1932

Species of moth

Scrobipalpa subroseata is a moth in the family Gelechiidae. It was described by Edward Meyrick in 1932. It is found in Uganda.
