= Scrobipalpa remanella =

Scientific classification
- Kingdom: Animalia
- Phylum: Arthropoda
- Clade: Pancrustacea
- Class: Insecta
- Order: Lepidoptera
- Family: Gelechiidae
- Genus: Scrobipalpa
- Species: S. remanella

Binomial name
- Scrobipalpa remanella Povolný, 1966

Species of moth

Scrobipalpa remanella is a moth in the family Gelechiidae. It was described by Dalibor Povolný in 1966. It is found in Iraq.

The length of the forewings is about 6 mm (0.24 in).
