= Scrobipalpa ochraceella =

Scientific classification
- Domain: Eukaryota
- Kingdom: Animalia
- Phylum: Arthropoda
- Class: Insecta
- Order: Lepidoptera
- Family: Gelechiidae
- Genus: Scrobipalpa
- Species: S. ochraceella

Binomial name
- Scrobipalpa ochraceella (Chrétien, 1915)

Synonyms
- Lita ochraceella Chrétien, 1915

Species of moth

Scrobipalpa ochraceella is a moth in the family Gelechiidae. It was described by Pierre Chrétien in 1915. It is found in Algeria and Tunisia.

The wingspan is 10–12 mm (0.39–0.47 in).
