= Scrobipalpa obtemperata =

Scientific classification
- Kingdom: Animalia
- Phylum: Arthropoda
- Class: Insecta
- Order: Lepidoptera
- Family: Gelechiidae
- Genus: Scrobipalpa
- Species: S. obtemperata

Binomial name
- Scrobipalpa obtemperata (Meyrick, 1925)

Synonyms
- Phthorimaea obtemperata Meyrick, 1925

Species of moth

Scrobipalpa obtemperata is a moth in the family Gelechiidae. It was described by Edward Meyrick in 1925. It is found in Egypt.
