= Scrobipalpa mongoloides =

Scientific classification
- Kingdom: Animalia
- Phylum: Arthropoda
- Clade: Pancrustacea
- Class: Insecta
- Order: Lepidoptera
- Family: Gelechiidae
- Genus: Scrobipalpa
- Species: S. mongoloides

Binomial name
- Scrobipalpa mongoloides Povolný, 1969

Species of moth

Scrobipalpa mongoloides is a moth in the family Gelechiidae. It was described by Povolný in 1969. It is found in Kazakhstan, Kyrgyzstan, northern Pakistan, Uzbekistan, China (Gansu, Hebei, Henan, Inner Mongolia, Ningxia, Qinghai, Xinjiang) and Mongolia.
