= Scrobipalpa soffneri =

Scientific classification
- Kingdom: Animalia
- Phylum: Arthropoda
- Clade: Pancrustacea
- Class: Insecta
- Order: Lepidoptera
- Family: Gelechiidae
- Genus: Scrobipalpa
- Species: S. soffneri

Binomial name
- Scrobipalpa soffneri Povolný, 1964

Species of moth

Scrobipalpa soffneri is a moth belonging to the family Gelechiidae, described by Povolný in 1964. It is found in Bulgaria, the southern Ural Mountains, and Turkmenistan.
