= Scrobipalpa divergens =

Scientific classification
- Kingdom: Animalia
- Phylum: Arthropoda
- Clade: Pancrustacea
- Class: Insecta
- Order: Lepidoptera
- Family: Gelechiidae
- Genus: Scrobipalpa
- Species: S. divergens

Binomial name
- Scrobipalpa divergens (Povolný, 2002)

Synonyms
- Euscrobipalpa divergens Povolný, 2002

Species of moth

Scrobipalpa divergens is a moth in the family Gelechiidae. It was described by Povolný in 2002. It is found in China (Xinjiang) where there are 71 species of the genus Scrobipalpa.
