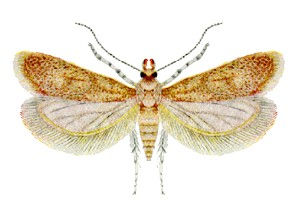
- Scrobipalpa aptatella

Scientific classification
- Kingdom: Animalia
- Phylum: Arthropoda
- Clade: Pancrustacea
- Class: Insecta
- Order: Lepidoptera
- Family: Gelechiidae
- Subfamily: Gelechiinae
- Genus: Scrobipalpa; Janse, 1951

Synonyms
- Ilseopsis Povolný 1965; Ergasiola Povolný 1967; Euscrobipalpa Povolný 1967; Magnifacia Povolný, 1967; Scrobipalpoides Povolný, 1985

= Scrobipalpa =

Genus of moths

Scrobipalpa is a genus of moths in the family Gelechiidae. Euscrobipalpa has sometimes been treated as a distinct subgenus, or even as a full genus, but is generally no longer recognised as valid, following Ponomarenko & Park (2007).

== Species ==
- Scrobipalpa abai Povolný, 1977
- Scrobipalpa abstrusa Huemer & Karsholt, 2010
- Scrobipalpa acuminatella (Sircom, 1850)
- Scrobipalpa acuta (Povolný, 2001)
- Scrobipalpa adaptata (Povolný, 2001)
- Scrobipalpa admirabilis Bidzilya, 2021
- Scrobipalpa aestivans Falkovitsh & Bidzilya, 2003
- Scrobipalpa afromontana Bidzilya, 2021
- Scrobipalpa aganophthalma (Meyrick, 1931)
- Scrobipalpa agassizi Bidzilya, 2021
- Scrobipalpa ahasver Povolný, 1969
- Scrobipalpa albofusca Povolný, 1971
- Scrobipalpa albostriata Povolný, 1977
- Scrobipalpa algeriensis Povolný & Bradley, 1965
- Scrobipalpa alia (Falkovitsh & Bidzilya, 2006)
- Scrobipalpa alterna (Falkovitsh & Bidzilya, 2006)
- Scrobipalpa amseli Povolný, 1966
- Scrobipalpa anatolica Povolný, 1973
- Scrobipalpa aptatella (Walker, 1864)
- Scrobipalpa arborealis Povolný, 1978
- Scrobipalpa arenaceariella (Powell & Povolný, 2001)
- Scrobipalpa arenicola Bidzilya, 2023
- Scrobipalpa arenbergeri Povolný, 1973
- Scrobipalpa argentea Povolný, 1969
- Scrobipalpa argenteonigra Povolný, 1972
- Scrobipalpa artemisiella (Treitschke, 1833)
- Scrobipalpa asantesana Bidzilya, 2021
- Scrobipalpa atriplex (Busck, 1910)
- Scrobipalpa atriplicella (Fischer von Röslerstamm, 1841)
- Scrobipalpa audax Povolný, 1966
- Scrobipalpa aulorrhoa (Meyrick, 1935)
- Scrobipalpa autonoma Povolný, 1969
- Scrobipalpa avetjanae Emelyanov & Piskunov, 1982
- Scrobipalpa bahai Povolný, 1977
- Scrobipalpa bahrainica Povolný, 1966
- Scrobipalpa bandiamiri Povolný, 1968
- Scrobipalpa bazae Povolný, 1977
- Scrobipalpa bidzilyai (Povolry, 2001)
- Scrobipalpa bifasciata Povolný, 1971
- Scrobipalpa bigoti Povolný, 1973
- Scrobipalpa biljurshi Povolný, 1980
- Scrobipalpa biskrae Povolný, 1977
- Scrobipalpa blapsigona (Meyrick, 1916)
- Scrobipalpa bradleyi Povolný, 1971
- Scrobipalpa brahmiella (Heyden, 1862)
- Scrobipalpa brandbergensis Bidzilya & Mey, 2011
- Scrobipalpa brandti Povolný, 1972
- Scrobipalpa bulganensis Povolný, 1969
- Scrobipalpa burkutica Bidzilya, 2023
- Scrobipalpa burmanni Povolný, 1971
- Scrobipalpa bryophiloides Povolný, 1966
- Scrobipalpa camphorosmella Nel, 1999
- Scrobipalpa candicans (Povolný, 1996)
- Scrobipalpa caryocoloides Povolný, 1977
- Scrobipalpa caucasica (Povolný, 2001)
- Scrobipalpa chersophila (Meyrick, 1909)
- Scrobipalpa chetitica Povolný, 1974
- Scrobipalpa chinensis Povolný, 1969
- Scrobipalpa chitensis (Povolný, 2001)
- Scrobipalpa chrysanthemella (Hofmann, 1867)
- Scrobipalpa clintoni Povolný, 1968
- Scrobipalpa coctans Povolný, 1969
- Scrobipalpa concerna Povolný, 1969
- Scrobipalpa concreta (Meyrick, 1914)
- Scrobipalpa confusa Povolný, 1966
- Scrobipalpa consueta (Braun, 1925)
- Scrobipalpa corleyi Huemer & Karsholt, 2010
- Scrobipalpa corsicamontes Varenne & Nel, 2013
- Scrobipalpa costella (Humphreys & Westwood, 1845)
- Scrobipalpa crepera (Falkovitsh & Bidzilya, 2006)
- Scrobipalpa cryptica Povolný, 1969
- Scrobipalpa cultrata Povolný, 1971
- Scrobipalpa dagmaris Povolný, 1987
- Scrobipalpa dalibori Lvovsky & Piskunov, 1989
- Scrobipalpa delattini Povolny, 1969
- Scrobipalpa deluccae Povolný, 1966
- Scrobipalpa deutschi Huemer & Karsholt, 2010
- Scrobipalpa disjectella (Staudinger, 1859)
- Scrobipalpa distincta Bidzilya & Li, 2010
- Scrobipalpa divergens (Povolný, 2002)
- Scrobipalpa diversa (Janse, 1950)
- Scrobipalpa divisella (Rebel, 1936)
- Scrobipalpa dorsoflava (Povolný, 1996)
- Scrobipalpa dorsolutea Huemer & Karsholt, 2010
- Scrobipalpa ebertiana Povolný, 1967
- Scrobipalpa ephysteroides (Povolný, 1967)
- Scrobipalpa eremica Povolný, 1967
- Scrobipalpa erexita Bidzilya, 2021
- Scrobipalpa ergasima (Meyrick, 1916)
- Scrobipalpa erichi Povolný, 1964
- Scrobipalpa erichiodes Bidzilya & Li, 2010
- Scrobipalpa eschatopis (Meyrick, 1904)
- Scrobipalpa ethiopica Bidzilya, 2021
- Scrobipalpa etoshensis Bidzilya, 2021
- Scrobipalpa extensa Povolný, 1969
- Scrobipalpa felixi Povolný, 1978
- Scrobipalpa feralella (Zeller, 1872)
- Scrobipalpa filia Povolný, 1969
- Scrobipalpa flavidinigra Bidzilya & Li, 2010
- Scrobipalpa flavimaculata Bidzilya & Li, 2010
- Scrobipalpa flavinerva Bidzilya & Li, 2010
- Scrobipalpa forsteri Povolný, 1971
- Scrobipalpa frugifera Povolný, 1969
- Scrobipalpa fusca Bidzilya & Li, 2010
- Scrobipalpa gallicella (Constant, 1885)
- Scrobipalpa gallicola Falkovitsh & Bidzilya, 2003
- Scrobipalpa gecko (Walsingham, 1911)
- Scrobipalpa geomicta (Meyrick, 1918)
- Scrobipalpa gobica Povolný, 1969
- Scrobipalpa gozmanyi Povolný, 1969
- Scrobipalpa grisea Povolný, 1969
- Scrobipalpa griseata Bidzilya, 2021
- Scrobipalpa griseoflava Bidzilya & Budashkin, 2011
- Scrobipalpa griseofusella (Toll, 1947)
- Scrobipalpa grossoides (Povolný, 2001)
- Scrobipalpa guttata Povolný, 1969
- Scrobipalpa halimifolia Bidzilya & Budashkin, 2011
- Scrobipalpa halimioniella Huemer & Karsholt, 2010
- Scrobipalpa halophila Povolný, 1973
- Scrobipalpa halymella (Millière, 1864)
- Scrobipalpa hannemanni Povolný, 1966
- Scrobipalpa halonella (Herrich-Schäffer, 1854)
- Scrobipalpa heimi Huemer & Karsholt, 2010
- Scrobipalpa helmuti Povolný, 1977
- Scrobipalpa hendrikseni Huemer & Karsholt, 2010
- Scrobipalpa heratella Povolný, 1967
- Scrobipalpa heretica Povolný, 1973
- Scrobipalpa hoenei Bidzilya & Li, 2010
- Scrobipalpa hungariae (Staudinger, 1871)
- Scrobipalpa hyoscyamella (Stainton, 1869)
- Scrobipalpa hyssopi Nel, 2003
- Scrobipalpa ignorans (Povolný, 1987)
- Scrobipalpa incola (Meyrick, 1912)
- Scrobipalpa indignella (Staudinger, 1879)
- Scrobipalpa inferna Povolný, 1973
- Scrobipalpa instabilella (Douglas, 1846)
- Scrobipalpa intima (Povolný, 2001)
- Scrobipalpa intricata Povolný, 1969
- Scrobipalpa jariorum Huemer & Karsholt, 2010
- Scrobipalpa kalidii (Falkovitsh & Bidzilya, 2006)
- Scrobipalpa karadaghi (Povolný, 2001)
- Scrobipalpa karischi Povolný, 1992
- Scrobipalpa kasyi Povolný, 1966
- Scrobipalpa kasyvartianella Povolný, 1967
- Scrobipalpa kaszabi Povolný, 1969
- Scrobipalpa keredjensis Povolný, 1968
- Scrobipalpa krasilnikovae Piskunov, 1990
- Scrobipalpa kumatai Povolný, 1977
- Scrobipalpa kurokoi Povolný, 1977
- Scrobipalpa kyrana Povolný, 2001
- Scrobipalpa lagodes (Meyrick, 1926)
- Scrobipalpa laisinca Povolný, 1976
- Scrobipalpa latiuncella Bidzilya & Li, 2010
- Scrobipalpa leucocephala (Lower, 1893)
- Scrobipalpa libanonica Povolný, 1966
- Scrobipalpa liui Li & Bidzilya, 2019
- Scrobipalpa lutea Povolný, 1977
- Scrobipalpa macromaculata (Braun, 1925)
- Scrobipalpa magnificella Povolný, 1967
- Scrobipalpa manchurica (Matsumura, 1931)
- Scrobipalpa manhunkai Povolný, 1979
- Scrobipalpa maniaca Povolný, 1969
- Scrobipalpa marmorella Povolný, 1969
- Scrobipalpa meridioafricana Bidzilya & Mey, 2011
- Scrobipalpa meteorica Povolný, 1984
- Scrobipalpa meyricki Povolný, 1971
- Scrobipalpa minimella Povolný, 1968
- Scrobipalpa minimella (Turati, 1929)
- Scrobipalpa mixta Huemer & Karsholt, 2010
- Scrobipalpa moghrebanella (Lucas, 1937)
- Scrobipalpa mongolica Povolný, 1969
- Scrobipalpa mongoloides Povolný, 1969
- Scrobipalpa monochromella (Constant, 1895)
- Scrobipalpa montafghana Povolný, 1968
- Scrobipalpa montanella (Chrétien, 1910)
- Scrobipalpa monumentella (Chambers, 1877)
- Scrobipalpa munita Bidzilya, 2021
- Scrobipalpa murinella (Duponchel, 1843)
- Scrobipalpa nana Povolný, 1973
- Scrobipalpa natalensis Bidzilya, 2021
- Scrobipalpa nigrigrisea Bidzilya & Li, 2010
- Scrobipalpa nigripuncta Bidzilya & Li, 2010
- Scrobipalpa nigristriana Bidzilya, 2021
- Scrobipalpa nigrosparsea Povolný, 1969
- Scrobipalpa ningxica Li & Bidzilya, 2019
- Scrobipalpa nitentella (Fuchs, 1902)
- Scrobipalpa niveifacies Povolný, 1977
- Scrobipalpa nomias (Meyrick, 1921)
- Scrobipalpa nonyma (Turner, 1919)
- Scrobipalpa notata (Povolný, 2001)
- Scrobipalpa obscurus (Povolný, 1985)
- Scrobipalpa obsoletella (Fischer von Röslerstamm, 1841)
- Scrobipalpa obtemperata (Meyrick, 1925)
- Scrobipalpa occulta (Povolný, 2002)
- Scrobipalpa ocellatella (Boyd, 1858)
- Scrobipalpa ochracea Bidzilya, 2021
- Scrobipalpa ochraceella (Chrétien, 1915)
- Scrobipalpa ochromaculata (Lucas, 1950)
- Scrobipalpa ochrostigma Bidzilya & Li, 2010
- Scrobipalpa ochroxantha Bidzilya, 2021
- Scrobipalpa oleksiyella Huemer & Karsholt, 2010
- Scrobipalpa omachella (Oberthür, 1888)
- Scrobipalpa optima Povolný, 1969
- Scrobipalpa orientalis Povolný, 1968
- Scrobipalpa otregata Povolný, 1972
- Scrobipalpa panjaensis Povolný, 1968
- Scrobipalpa paradoxa Piskunov, 1990
- Scrobipalpa parki (Povolný, 1993)
- Scrobipalpa parvipulex (Walsingham, 1911)
- Scrobipalpa pauperella (Heinemann, 1870)
- Scrobipalpa perfecta (Povolný, 1996)
- Scrobipalpa perinii (Klimesch, 1951)
- Scrobipalpa perinoides Povolný, 1967
- Scrobipalpa peterseni (Povolný, 1965)
- Scrobipalpa phagnalella (Constant, 1895)
- Scrobipalpa phelotris (Meyrick, 1909)
- Scrobipalpa picta Povolný, 1969
- Scrobipalpa planodes (Meyrick, 1918)
- Scrobipalpa plesiopicta Povolný, 1969
- Scrobipalpa portosanctana (Stainton, 1859)
- Scrobipalpa postulatella Huemer & Karsholt, 2010
- Scrobipalpa povolnyi Emelyanov & Piskunov, 1982
- Scrobipalpa proclivella (Fuchs, 1886)
- Scrobipalpa psammophila Li & Bidzilya, 2019
- Scrobipalpa pseudolutea Piskunov, 1990
- Scrobipalpa pulchra Povolný, 1967
- Scrobipalpa punctata (Povolný, 1996)
- Scrobipalpa punctulata Li & Bidzilya, 2019
- Scrobipalpa puplesisi Piskunov, 1990
- Scrobipalpa pustovarovi Piskunov, 1990
- Scrobipalpa pyrrhanthes (Meyrick, 1904)
- Scrobipalpa rebeli (Preissecker, 1914)
- Scrobipalpa reiprichi Povolný, 1984
- Scrobipalpa remanella Povolný, 1966
- Scrobipalpa remota Povolný, 1972
- Scrobipalpa richteri Povolný, 1968
- Scrobipalpa rjabovi Piskunov, 1990
- Scrobipalpa salicorniae (Hering, 1889)
- Scrobipalpa salinella (Zeller, 1847)
- Scrobipalpa saltans Wakeham-Dawson, 2012
- Scrobipalpa samadensis (Pfaffenzeller, 1870)
- Scrobipalpa sattleri Lvovsky & Piskunov, 1989
- Scrobipalpa scrobipalpulina Povolný, 1967
- Scrobipalpa scutellariaeella (Chambers, 1873)
- Scrobipalpa selectella (Caradja, 1920)
- Scrobipalpa selectoides Bidzilya, 2021
- Scrobipalpa semnani Povolný, 1967
- Scrobipalpa septentrionalis Li & Bidzilya, 2019
- Scrobipalpa sibila (Meyrick, 1921)
- Scrobipalpa similis Povolný, 1973
- Scrobipalpa sindibad Povolný, 1981
- Scrobipalpa sinica Bidzilya & Li, 2010
- Scrobipalpa skulei Huemer & Karsholt, 2010
- Scrobipalpa smithi Povolný & Bradley, 1965
- Scrobipalpa soffneri Povolný, 1964
- Scrobipalpa solitaria Povolný, 1969
- Scrobipalpa spergulariella (Chrétien, 1910)
- Scrobipalpa splendens Povolný, 1973
- Scrobipalpa spumata (Povolný, 2001)
- Scrobipalpa stabilis Povolný, 1977
- Scrobipalpa stangei (Hering, 1889)
- Scrobipalpa staudei Bidzilya, 2021
- Scrobipalpa strictella Bidzilya & Li, 2010
- Scrobipalpa suaedella (Richardson, 1893)
- Scrobipalpa suaedicola (Mabille, 1906)
- Scrobipalpa suaedivorella (Chrétien, 1915)
- Scrobipalpa suasella (Constant, 1895)
- Scrobipalpa suaveolens (Povolný, 1996)
- Scrobipalpa subnitens Povolný, 1969
- Scrobipalpa subroseata (Meyrick, 1932)
- Scrobipalpa substricta Povolný, 1967
- Scrobipalpa superstes Povolný, 1977
- Scrobipalpa swakopi Bidzilya & Mey, 2011
- Scrobipalpa synurella Povolný, 1977
- Scrobipalpa tereskeni (Falkovitsh & Bidzilya, 2006)
- Scrobipalpa thymelaeae (Amsel, 1939)
- Scrobipalpa tokari Huemer & Karsholt, 2010
- Scrobipalpa traganella (Chrétien, 1915)
- Scrobipalpa triangulella Li & Bidzilya, 2019
- Scrobipalpa trifida (Povolný, 1987)
- Scrobipalpa trinella (Fuchs, 1903)
- Scrobipalpa tripunctella Li & Bidzilya, 2019
- Scrobipalpa tristrigata (Meyrick, 1938)
- Scrobipalpa turiensis Bidzilya, 2021
- Scrobipalpa typica Bidzilya, 2021
- Scrobipalpa ultima Povolný, 1969
- Scrobipalpa uncispina (Povolný, 1987)
- Scrobipalpa usingeri Povolný, 1969
- Scrobipalpa ustulatella (Staudinger, 1871)
- Scrobipalpa vaccans Povolný, 1969
- Scrobipalpa varivansoni Bidzilya, 2021
- Scrobipalpa vartianorum Povolný, 1968
- Scrobipalpa vasconiella (Rössler, 1877)
- Scrobipalpa vladimiri Povolný, 1966
- Scrobipalpa voltinella (Chrétien, 1898)
- Scrobipalpa voltinelloides Povolný, 1967
- Scrobipalpa walsinghami Povolný, 1971
- Scrobipalpa wieseri Bidzilya, 2021
- Scrobipalpa wiltshirei Povolný, 1966
- Scrobipalpa wolframi Bidzilya, 2021
- Scrobipalpa zagulajevi Lvovsky & Piskunov, 1989
- Scrobipalpa zaitzevi Piskunov, 1990
- Scrobipalpa zhengi Li & Bidzilya, 2019
- Scrobipalpa zhongweina Li & Bidzilya, 2019
- Scrobipalpa zizera Povolný, 1969
- Scrobipalpa zouhari Povolný, 1984

== Former species ==
- Scrobipalpa asiri Povolný, 1980
- Scrobipalpa deleta Povolny, 1981
- Scrobipalpa fraterna Povolný, 1969
- Scrobipalpa gallincolella (Mann, 1872)
- Scrobipalpa gorodkovi Bidzilya, 2012
- Scrobipalpa gregori Povolný, 1967
- Scrobipalpa klimeschi Povolny, 1967
- Scrobipalpa milleri Povolny, 1977
- Scrobipalpa rebeliella Hauder, 1917
- Scrobipalpa sibirica Bidzilya, 2009
- Scrobipalpa trebujenae Povolny, 1977
- Scrobipalpa vicaria (Meyrick, 1921)
- Scrobipalpa xylochroa Janse, 1963

== Status unclear ==
- Homaloxestis ocyphanes Meyrick, 1937
- Lita melanella Heinemann, 1870
  - synonym: Lita nigripalpella Heinemann, 1870
- Lita trochilella Heinemann, 1870
- Phthorimaea pendens Meyrick, 1918
