= Scrobipalpa tereskeni =

Scientific classification
- Domain: Eukaryota
- Kingdom: Animalia
- Phylum: Arthropoda
- Class: Insecta
- Order: Lepidoptera
- Family: Gelechiidae
- Genus: Scrobipalpa
- Species: S. tereskeni

Binomial name
- Scrobipalpa tereskeni (Falkovitsh & Bidzilya, 2006)

Synonyms
- Euscrobipalpa tereskeni Falkovitsh & Bidzilya, 2006

Species of moth

Scrobipalpa tereskeni is a moth in the family Gelechiidae. It was described by Mark I. Falkovitsh and Oleksiy V. Bidzilya in 2006. It is found in Uzbekistan.

The wingspan is 10–11 mm (0.39–0.43 in).

The larvae feed on Krascheninnikovia ceratoides.
