= Scrobipalpa semnani =

Scientific classification
- Kingdom: Animalia
- Phylum: Arthropoda
- Clade: Pancrustacea
- Class: Insecta
- Order: Lepidoptera
- Family: Gelechiidae
- Genus: Scrobipalpa
- Species: S. semnani

Binomial name
- Scrobipalpa semnani Povolný, 1967

Synonyms
- Scrobipalpa picta Povolný, 1969 (preocc.); Scrobipalpa falsa Povolný, 1969; Scrobipalpa pictula Povolný, 1976

Species of moth

Scrobipalpa semnani is a moth in the family Gelechiidae. It was described by Povolný in 1967. It is found in Iran.
