= Scrobipalpa flavimaculata =

Scientific classification
- Domain: Eukaryota
- Kingdom: Animalia
- Phylum: Arthropoda
- Class: Insecta
- Order: Lepidoptera
- Family: Gelechiidae
- Genus: Scrobipalpa
- Species: S. flavimaculata

Binomial name
- Scrobipalpa flavimaculata Bidzilya & Li, 2010

Species of moth

Scrobipalpa flavimaculata is a moth in the family Gelechiidae. It was described by Oleksiy V. Bidzilya and Hou-Hun Li in 2010. It is found in Qinghai, China.

The wingspan is about 13 mm (0.51 in).
