= Scrobipalpa punctata =

Scientific classification
- Kingdom: Animalia
- Phylum: Arthropoda
- Clade: Pancrustacea
- Class: Insecta
- Order: Lepidoptera
- Family: Gelechiidae
- Genus: Scrobipalpa
- Species: S. punctata

Binomial name
- Scrobipalpa punctata (Povolný, 1996)

Synonyms
- Ilseopsis (Euscrobipalpa) punctata Povolný, 1996

Species of moth

Scrobipalpa punctata is a moth of the family Gelechiidae. It is found in Russia (the southern Ural) and Kyrgyzstan.
