= Scrobipalpa swakopi =

Scientific classification
- Kingdom: Animalia
- Phylum: Arthropoda
- Clade: Pancrustacea
- Class: Insecta
- Order: Lepidoptera
- Family: Gelechiidae
- Genus: Scrobipalpa
- Species: S. swakopi

Binomial name
- Scrobipalpa swakopi Bidzilya & Mey, 2011

Species of moth

Scrobipalpa swakopi is a moth in the family Gelechiidae. It was described by Oleksiy V. Bidzilya and Wolfram Mey in 2011. It is found in Namibia.
