= Scrobipalpa grisea =

Scientific classification
- Kingdom: Animalia
- Phylum: Arthropoda
- Clade: Pancrustacea
- Class: Insecta
- Order: Lepidoptera
- Family: Gelechiidae
- Genus: Scrobipalpa
- Species: S. grisea

Binomial name
- Scrobipalpa grisea Povolný, 1969

Synonyms
- Scrobipalpa grisea f. uralensis Povolný, 1973

Species of moth

Scrobipalpa grisea is a moth of the family Gelechiidae. It is found in Russia (Middle Volga and southern Ural and Siberia: Tuva), Korea, Mongolia and China (Inner Mongolia).
