= Scrobipalpa planodes =

Scientific classification
- Kingdom: Animalia
- Phylum: Arthropoda
- Class: Insecta
- Order: Lepidoptera
- Family: Gelechiidae
- Genus: Scrobipalpa
- Species: S. planodes

Binomial name
- Scrobipalpa planodes (Meyrick, 1918)

Synonyms
- Gelechia planodes Meyrick, 1918

Species of moth

Scrobipalpa planodes is a moth in the family Gelechiidae. It was described by Edward Meyrick in 1918. It is found in southern India.

The wingspan is about 13 mm (0.51 in). The forewings are white irregularly sprinkled with grey and brownish and with a streak of fuscous suffusion through the disc from near the base to the end of the cell, the discal stigmata forming small cloudy brownish spots on the upper edge of this, a streak of obscure brownish suffusion from its apex to the tornus. The hindwings are light grey.
