= Scrobipalpa minimella =

Scientific classification
- Domain: Eukaryota
- Kingdom: Animalia
- Phylum: Arthropoda
- Class: Insecta
- Order: Lepidoptera
- Family: Gelechiidae
- Genus: Scrobipalpa
- Species: S. minimella

Binomial name
- Scrobipalpa minimella (Turati, 1929)

Synonyms
- Phthorimaea minimella Turati, 1929; Lita micrella Turati, 1932

Species of moth

Scrobipalpa minimella is a moth in the family Gelechiidae. It was described by Turati in 1929. It is found in Tunisia.
