= Scrobipalpa niveifacies =

Scientific classification
- Kingdom: Animalia
- Phylum: Arthropoda
- Clade: Pancrustacea
- Class: Insecta
- Order: Lepidoptera
- Family: Gelechiidae
- Genus: Scrobipalpa
- Species: S. niveifacies

Binomial name
- Scrobipalpa niveifacies Povolný, 1977

Synonyms
- Scrobipalpa milleri Povolný, 1977

Species of moth

Scrobipalpa niveifacies is a moth in the family Gelechiidae. It was described by Povolný in 1977. It is found in southern Spain and Portugal.

The length of the forewings is about 5.5 mm (0.22 in).

The larvae feed on Atriplex halimus.
