= Scrobipalpa nigrigrisea =

Scientific classification
- Domain: Eukaryota
- Kingdom: Animalia
- Phylum: Arthropoda
- Class: Insecta
- Order: Lepidoptera
- Family: Gelechiidae
- Genus: Scrobipalpa
- Species: S. nigrigrisea

Binomial name
- Scrobipalpa nigrigrisea Bidzilya & Li, 2010

Species of moth

Scrobipalpa nigrigrisea is a moth in the family Gelechiidae. It was described by Oleksiy V. Bidzilya and Hou-Hun Li in 2010. It is found in Tibet.

== Etymology ==
The species name refers to the blackish-grey forewings and is derived from the Latin prefix nigr- (meaning black) and Latin griseus (meaning grey).
