= Scrobipalpa halophila =

Scientific classification
- Kingdom: Animalia
- Phylum: Arthropoda
- Clade: Pancrustacea
- Class: Insecta
- Order: Lepidoptera
- Family: Gelechiidae
- Genus: Scrobipalpa
- Species: S. halophila

Binomial name
- Scrobipalpa halophila Povolný, 1973

Species of moth

Scrobipalpa halophila is a moth in the family Gelechiidae. It was described by Povolný in 1973. It is found in Turkey.

The length of the forewings is about 7 mm (0.28 in). The forewings are whitish with three black marks. The hindwings are dirty whitish.
