= Scrobipalpa similis =

Scientific classification
- Kingdom: Animalia
- Phylum: Arthropoda
- Clade: Pancrustacea
- Class: Insecta
- Order: Lepidoptera
- Family: Gelechiidae
- Genus: Scrobipalpa
- Species: S. similis

Binomial name
- Scrobipalpa similis Povolný, 1973

Species of moth

Scrobipalpa similis is a moth in the family Gelechiidae. It was described by Povolný in 1973. It is found in China (Xinjiang), Mongolia, Russia (Chitinskaya oblast) and south-eastern Kazakhstan.
