= Scrobipalpa flavidinigra =

Scientific classification
- Domain: Eukaryota
- Kingdom: Animalia
- Phylum: Arthropoda
- Class: Insecta
- Order: Lepidoptera
- Family: Gelechiidae
- Genus: Scrobipalpa
- Species: S. flavidinigra

Binomial name
- Scrobipalpa flavidinigra Bidzilya & Li, 2010

Species of moth

Scrobipalpa flavidinigra is a moth in the family Gelechiidae. It was described by Oleksiy V. Bidzilya and Hou-Hun Li in 2010. It is found in China in Inner Mongolia and Ningxia.

The wingspan is 10–10.7 mm (0.39–0.42 in). Adults are on wing in July and August.

== Etymology ==
The species name refers to the wing pattern and is derived from Latin flavidus (meaning yellowish) and niger (meaning black).
