= Scrobipalpa divisella =

Scientific classification
- Domain: Eukaryota
- Kingdom: Animalia
- Phylum: Arthropoda
- Class: Insecta
- Order: Lepidoptera
- Family: Gelechiidae
- Genus: Scrobipalpa
- Species: S. divisella

Binomial name
- Scrobipalpa divisella (Rebel, 1936)

Synonyms
- Lita divisella Rebel, 1936

Species of moth

Scrobipalpa divisella is a moth in the family Gelechiidae. It was described by Hans Rebel in 1936. It is found in Spain and Turkey.
