= Scrobipalpa monumentella =

Scientific classification
- Kingdom: Animalia
- Phylum: Arthropoda
- Clade: Pancrustacea
- Class: Insecta
- Order: Lepidoptera
- Family: Gelechiidae
- Genus: Scrobipalpa
- Species: S. monumentella

Binomial name
- Scrobipalpa monumentella (Chambers, 1877)

Synonyms
- Gelechia monumentella Chambers, 1877

Species of moth

Scrobipalpa monumentella is a moth in the family Gelechiidae. It was described by Vactor Tousey Chambers in 1877. It is found in North America, where it has been recorded from Colorado and California.

Adults are pale ocherous, irrorated (speckled) with pale gray and with several small fuscous specks on the forewings, two of which are on the fold, and a series of indistinct ones around the base of the cilia.

The larvae feed on Francenia grandiflora.
