= Scrobipalpa griseoflava =

Scientific classification
- Domain: Eukaryota
- Kingdom: Animalia
- Phylum: Arthropoda
- Class: Insecta
- Order: Lepidoptera
- Family: Gelechiidae
- Genus: Scrobipalpa
- Species: S. griseoflava

Binomial name
- Scrobipalpa griseoflava Bidzilya & Budashkin, 2011

Species of moth

Scrobipalpa griseoflava is a moth in the family Gelechiidae. It was described by Oleksiy V. Bidzilya and Yury I. Budashkin in 2011. It is found on the Crimea. Adults are on wing from mid-May to mid-June.

The larvae probably feed on Halimione verrucifera.
