= Scrobipalpa sindibad =

Scientific classification
- Kingdom: Animalia
- Phylum: Arthropoda
- Clade: Pancrustacea
- Class: Insecta
- Order: Lepidoptera
- Family: Gelechiidae
- Genus: Scrobipalpa
- Species: S. sindibad

Binomial name
- Scrobipalpa sindibad Povolný, 1981

Species of moth

Scrobipalpa sindibad is a moth in the family Gelechiidae. It was described by Povolný in 1981. It is found in Iraq.

The length of the forewings is 4.5–4.8 mm (0.18–0.19 in).
