= Scrobipalpa stabilis =

Scientific classification
- Kingdom: Animalia
- Phylum: Arthropoda
- Clade: Pancrustacea
- Class: Insecta
- Order: Lepidoptera
- Family: Gelechiidae
- Genus: Scrobipalpa
- Species: S. stabilis

Binomial name
- Scrobipalpa stabilis Povolný, 1977

Synonyms
- Scrobipalpa instabilella stabilis Povolný, 1977

Species of moth

Scrobipalpa stabilis is a moth in the family Gelechiidae. It was described by Povolný in 1977. It is found in southern Spain.

The length of the forewings is about 6.5 mm (0.26 in).
