= Scrobipalpa incola =

Scientific classification
- Kingdom: Animalia
- Phylum: Arthropoda
- Class: Insecta
- Order: Lepidoptera
- Family: Gelechiidae
- Genus: Scrobipalpa
- Species: S. incola

Binomial name
- Scrobipalpa incola (Meyrick, 1912)

Synonyms
- Megacraspedus incola Meyrick, 1912; Gelechia bletrias Meyrick, 1913

Species of moth

Scrobipalpa incola is a moth in the family Gelechiidae. It was described by Edward Meyrick in 1912. It is found in South Africa and Zimbabwe.

The wingspan is about 25 mm (0.98 in). The forewings are pale ochreous partially tinged with whitish, and sprinkled irregularly with brownish. There are two small spots of black sprinkles on the costa towards the base, and beneath the costa in the middle, and four on the costa posteriorly. There is also a dot of blackish sprinkles near the base in the middle, one in the disc at one-sixth, one on the fold beyond this, and three representing stigmata, the plical rather obliquely before the first discal. There are some scattered black scales towards the costa posteriorly. The hindwings are whitish grey.
