= Scrobipalpa septentrionalis =

Scientific classification
- Kingdom: Animalia
- Phylum: Arthropoda
- Class: Insecta
- Order: Lepidoptera
- Family: Gelechiidae
- Genus: Scrobipalpa
- Species: S. septentrionalis

Binomial name
- Scrobipalpa septentrionalis Bidzilya & H.H. Li, 2019

Species of moth

Scrobipalpa septentrionalis is a species of moth native to northern China. It was one of nine Chinese species described by Oleksiy Bidzilya and Houhun Li in 2019. In coloration, it is mostly gray and brown, with some white on the head and antennae. Its wingspan is 11.0–13.5 millimetres (0.43–0.53 in). The plant on which it breeds is unknown.

== Taxonomy ==
By 2010, the genus Scrobipalpa contained over 300 recognized species, distributed throughout the Palearctic realm. That year, Oleksiy Bidzilya and Houhun Li described an additional thirteen from China, noting that Scrobipalpa had never been specially studied in the country. In 2019, the pair described an additional nine Chinese species, including Scrobipalpa septentrionalis. Its name comes from the Latin word for "northern", as it is found in the northern part of China. The type specimen, a male, was taken from Yuanyichang, Zhongning County, Ningxia Hui Autonomous Region.

== Description ==
Scrobipalpa septentrionalis has a wingspan 11.0–13.5 millimetres (0.43–0.53 in). The head, thorax, and tegulae (hardened pieces located on the upper back of certain insects) are covered by scales tipped with light grey-brown. The frons (part of the frontal portion of the head) is white. The second segment is mottled with brown on the outer surface and underside, while the upperside is white, while the third segment is light brown at its base and middle belts. The scape (first part of the antennae) is light brown, although the other segments of the antennae are brown with whitish rings toward the base. The forewings are creamy grey, blended with light brown, especially near their ends. The cilia (microscopic hairlike structures) and the hindwing are gray, with the former gray-brown tipped.

== Distribution and ecology ==
Scrobipalpa septentrionalis is found in Heilongjiang and Ningxia in northern China. Its host plant is unknown. The specimens studied were collected in July, at altitudes of 1,100–1,200 metres (3,600–3,900 ft).
