= Scrobipalpa vaccans =

Scientific classification
- Kingdom: Animalia
- Phylum: Arthropoda
- Clade: Pancrustacea
- Class: Insecta
- Order: Lepidoptera
- Family: Gelechiidae
- Genus: Scrobipalpa
- Species: S. vaccans

Binomial name
- Scrobipalpa vaccans Povolný, 1969

Synonyms
- Scrobipalpa (Euscrobipalpa) vaccans Povolný, 1969

Species of moth

Scrobipalpa vaccans is a moth in the family Gelechiidae. It was described by Povolný in 1969. It is found in Afghanistan.

The length of the forewings is about 4.9 mm (0.19 in).
