= Scrobipalpa karischi =

Scientific classification
- Kingdom: Animalia
- Phylum: Arthropoda
- Clade: Pancrustacea
- Class: Insecta
- Order: Lepidoptera
- Family: Gelechiidae
- Genus: Scrobipalpa
- Species: S. karischi

Binomial name
- Scrobipalpa karischi Povolný, 1992

Synonyms
- Ilseopsis (Euscrobipalpa) karischi Povolný, 1992

Species of moth

Scrobipalpa karischi is a moth in the family Gelechiidae. It was described by Povolný in 1992. It is found in Kazakhstan.
