= Scrobipalpa laisinca =

Scientific classification
- Kingdom: Animalia
- Phylum: Arthropoda
- Clade: Pancrustacea
- Class: Insecta
- Order: Lepidoptera
- Family: Gelechiidae
- Genus: Scrobipalpa
- Species: S. laisinca

Binomial name
- Scrobipalpa laisinca Povolný, 1976

Species of moth

Scrobipalpa laisinca is a moth in the family Gelechiidae. It was described by Povolný in 1976. It is found in southern Iran.

The length of the forewings 4–5 mm (0.16–0.20 in). The forewings are brownish with contrasting marks. There are three black stigmata and marginal dots. The hindwings are whitish with darker margins.
