= Scrobipalpa aulorrhoa =

Scientific classification
- Kingdom: Animalia
- Phylum: Arthropoda
- Class: Insecta
- Order: Lepidoptera
- Family: Gelechiidae
- Genus: Scrobipalpa
- Species: S. aulorrhoa

Binomial name
- Scrobipalpa aulorrhoa (Meyrick, 1935)

Synonyms
- Phthorimaea aulorrhoa Meyrick, 1935

Species of moth

Scrobipalpa aulorrhoa is a moth in the family Gelechiidae. It was described by Edward Meyrick in 1935. It is found in Argentina.
