= Scrobipalpa parki =

Scientific classification
- Kingdom: Animalia
- Phylum: Arthropoda
- Clade: Pancrustacea
- Class: Insecta
- Order: Lepidoptera
- Family: Gelechiidae
- Genus: Scrobipalpa
- Species: S. parki

Binomial name
- Scrobipalpa parki (Povolný, 1993)

Species of moth

Scrobipalpa parki is a moth in the family Gelechiidae. It was described by Povolný in 1993. It is found in Korea and China (Gansu, Hebei, Ningxia, Qinghai, Shaanxi, Xinjiang).

In South Korea, the larvae have been recorded feeding on Lycium chinese. In China, it was reared from Lycium barbarum.
