= Scrobipalpa oleksiyella =

Scientific classification
- Kingdom: Animalia
- Phylum: Arthropoda
- Clade: Pancrustacea
- Class: Insecta
- Order: Lepidoptera
- Family: Gelechiidae
- Genus: Scrobipalpa
- Species: S. oleksiyella

Binomial name
- Scrobipalpa oleksiyella Huemer & Karsholt, 2010

Species of moth

Scrobipalpa oleksiyella is a moth in the family Gelechiidae. It was described by Peter Huemer and Ole Karsholt in 2010. It is found in the southern Ural Mountains.

== Etymology ==
The species is named for Oleksiy Bidzilya in recognition of his important contribution to Palaearctic Gnorimoschemini.
