= Scrobipalpa gallicola =

Scientific classification
- Domain: Eukaryota
- Kingdom: Animalia
- Phylum: Arthropoda
- Class: Insecta
- Order: Lepidoptera
- Family: Gelechiidae
- Genus: Scrobipalpa
- Species: S. gallicola

Binomial name
- Scrobipalpa gallicola Falkovitsh & Bidzilya, 2003

Species of moth

Scrobipalpa gallicola is a moth in the family Gelechiidae. It was described by Mark I. Falkovitsh and Oleksiy V. Bidzilya in 2003. It is found in Uzbekistan.
