= Scrobipalpa nana =

Scientific classification
- Kingdom: Animalia
- Phylum: Arthropoda
- Clade: Pancrustacea
- Class: Insecta
- Order: Lepidoptera
- Family: Gelechiidae
- Genus: Scrobipalpa
- Species: S. nana

Binomial name
- Scrobipalpa nana Povolný, 1973

Synonyms
- Euscrobipalpa nana caroxyli Falkovitsh & Bidzilya, 2006

Species of moth

Scrobipalpa nana is a moth in the family Gelechiidae. It was described by Povolný in 1973. It is found in Turkey, northern Iran, Kazakhstan and the southern Ural Mountains.

The length of the forewings is 4–4.3 mm (0.16–0.17 in).

== Subspecies ==
- Scrobipalpa nana nana
- Scrobipalpa nana caroxyli (Falkovitsh & Bidzilya, 2006) (Kazakhstan)
