= Scrobipalpa ocyphanes =

Scientific classification
- Kingdom: Animalia
- Phylum: Arthropoda
- Class: Insecta
- Order: Lepidoptera
- Family: Gelechiidae
- Genus: Scrobipalpa
- Species: S. ocyphanes

Binomial name
- Scrobipalpa ocyphanes (Meyrick, 1937)

Synonyms
- Homaloxestis ocyphanes Meyrick, 1937

Species of moth

Scrobipalpa ocyphanes is a moth in the family Gelechiidae. It was described by Edward Meyrick in 1937. It is found in South Africa.
