= Scrobipalpa plesiopicta =

Scientific classification
- Kingdom: Animalia
- Phylum: Arthropoda
- Clade: Pancrustacea
- Class: Insecta
- Order: Lepidoptera
- Family: Gelechiidae
- Genus: Scrobipalpa
- Species: S. plesiopicta

Binomial name
- Scrobipalpa plesiopicta Povolný, 1969

Species of moth

Scrobipalpa plesiopicta is a moth of the family Gelechiidae. It is found in Russia (the southern Ural), Iran and Mongolia.
