= Scrobipalpa ustulatella =

Scientific classification
- Domain: Eukaryota
- Kingdom: Animalia
- Phylum: Arthropoda
- Class: Insecta
- Order: Lepidoptera
- Family: Gelechiidae
- Genus: Scrobipalpa
- Species: S. ustulatella

Binomial name
- Scrobipalpa ustulatella (Staudinger, 1871)

Synonyms
- Gelechia ustulatella Staudinger, 1871

Species of moth

Scrobipalpa ustulatella is a moth in the family Gelechiidae. It was described by Otto Staudinger in 1871. It is found in south-western Russia and Ukraine.

The wingspan is about 10 mm (0.39 in). The ground colour of the forewings is violet-grey densely sprinkled with black scales. The hindwings are lighter grey.
