= Scrobipalpa crepera =

Scientific classification
- Domain: Eukaryota
- Kingdom: Animalia
- Phylum: Arthropoda
- Class: Insecta
- Order: Lepidoptera
- Family: Gelechiidae
- Genus: Scrobipalpa
- Species: S. crepera

Binomial name
- Scrobipalpa crepera (Falkovitsh & Bidzilya, 2006)

Synonyms
- Euscrobipalpa crepera Falkovitsh & Bidzilya, 2006

Species of moth

Scrobipalpa crepera is a moth in the family Gelechiidae. It was described by Mark I. Falkovitsh and Oleksiy V. Bidzilya in 2006. It is found in south-eastern Kazakhstan.

The wingspan is about 9.5 mm (0.37 in).

The larvae feed on Halostachys caspica.
