= Scrobipalpa walsinghami =

Scientific classification
- Kingdom: Animalia
- Phylum: Arthropoda
- Clade: Pancrustacea
- Class: Insecta
- Order: Lepidoptera
- Family: Gelechiidae
- Genus: Scrobipalpa
- Species: S. walsinghami

Binomial name
- Scrobipalpa walsinghami Povolný, 1971

Synonyms
- Scrobipalpa wiltshirei Povolný, 1971 (preocc.)

Species of moth

Scrobipalpa walsinghami is a moth in the family Gelechiidae. It was described by Povolný in 1971. It is found in Tunisia.
