= Scrobipalpa phelotris =

Scientific classification
- Kingdom: Animalia
- Phylum: Arthropoda
- Class: Insecta
- Order: Lepidoptera
- Family: Gelechiidae
- Genus: Scrobipalpa
- Species: S. phelotris

Binomial name
- Scrobipalpa phelotris (Meyrick, 1909)

Synonyms
- Gelechia phelotris Meyrick, 1909

Species of moth

Scrobipalpa phelotris is a moth in the family Gelechiidae. It was described by Edward Meyrick in 1909. It is found in South Africa.

The wingspan is about 21 mm (0.83 in). The forewings are whitish ochreous, irregularly and suffusedly mixed throughout with brownish and rather dark fuscous. The stigmata are ferruginous with one or two dark fuscous scales, cloudy, indistinct, the plical obliquely before the first discal. There are indications of very indistinct dark fuscous dots around the posterior part of the costa and termen. The hindwings are grey whitish.
