= Scrobipalpa ephysteroides =

Scientific classification
- Kingdom: Animalia
- Phylum: Arthropoda
- Clade: Pancrustacea
- Class: Insecta
- Order: Lepidoptera
- Family: Gelechiidae
- Genus: Scrobipalpa
- Species: S. ephysteroides

Binomial name
- Scrobipalpa ephysteroides Povolný, 1967

Synonyms
- Scrobipalpa (Euscrobipalpa) ephysteroides Povolný, 1967

Species of moth

Scrobipalpa ephysteroides is a moth in the family Gelechiidae. It was described by Povolný in 1967. It is found in Afghanistan.
