= Scrobipalpa maniaca =

Scientific classification
- Kingdom: Animalia
- Phylum: Arthropoda
- Clade: Pancrustacea
- Class: Insecta
- Order: Lepidoptera
- Family: Gelechiidae
- Genus: Scrobipalpa
- Species: S. maniaca

Binomial name
- Scrobipalpa maniaca Povolný, 1969

Synonyms
- Scrobipalpa turkmeniella Piskunov, 1973

Species of moth

Scrobipalpa maniaca is a moth in the family Gelechiidae. It was described by Povolný in 1969. It is found in China (Xinjiang), Afghanistan, Mongolia, Russia (Lower Volga region, Chitinskaya oblast), Turkmenistan and Uzbekistan.

Larvae have been recorded within galls of Stefaniola deformans.
