= Scrobipalpa scrobipalpulina =

Scientific classification
- Kingdom: Animalia
- Phylum: Arthropoda
- Clade: Pancrustacea
- Class: Insecta
- Order: Lepidoptera
- Family: Gelechiidae
- Genus: Scrobipalpa
- Species: S. scrobipalpulina

Binomial name
- Scrobipalpa scrobipalpulina Povolný, 1967

Species of moth

Scrobipalpa scrobipalpulina is a moth in the family Gelechiidae. It was described by Povolný in 1967. It is found in northern Iran.
