= Scrobipalpa bahai =

Scientific classification
- Kingdom: Animalia
- Phylum: Arthropoda
- Clade: Pancrustacea
- Class: Insecta
- Order: Lepidoptera
- Family: Gelechiidae
- Genus: Scrobipalpa
- Species: S. bahai

Binomial name
- Scrobipalpa bahai Povolný, 1977

Species of moth

Scrobipalpa bahai is a moth in the family Gelechiidae. It was described by Povolný in 1977. It is found in Afghanistan.

The length of the forewings is about 3 mm (0.12 in) for males and 3.8 mm (0.15 in) for females.
