= Scrobipalpa vladimiri =

Scientific classification
- Kingdom: Animalia
- Phylum: Arthropoda
- Clade: Pancrustacea
- Class: Insecta
- Order: Lepidoptera
- Family: Gelechiidae
- Genus: Scrobipalpa
- Species: S. vladimiri

Binomial name
- Scrobipalpa vladimiri Povolný, 1966

Species of moth

Scrobipalpa vladimiri is a moth in the family Gelechiidae. It was described by Dalibor Povolný in 1966. It is found in Lebanon, Syria, and Turkey. A record from Germany probably represents Scrobipalpa atriplicella.

The length of the forewings is about 6 mm (0.24 in). The forewings are ashy-grey with scattered dark scales. The hindwings are light shining grey.
