= Scrobipalpa remota =

Scientific classification
- Kingdom: Animalia
- Phylum: Arthropoda
- Clade: Pancrustacea
- Class: Insecta
- Order: Lepidoptera
- Family: Gelechiidae
- Genus: Scrobipalpa
- Species: S. remota

Binomial name
- Scrobipalpa remota Povolný, 1972

Synonyms
- Euscrobipalpa remota ceratoides Falkovitsh & Bidzilya, 2006

Species of moth

Scrobipalpa remota is a moth in the family Gelechiidae. It was described by Povolný in 1972. It is found in northern Iran, Palestine and Algeria.

The length of the forewings is 4.5–6 mm (0.18–0.24 in).

== Subspecies ==
- Scrobipalpa remota remota
- Scrobipalpa remota ceratoides (Falkovitsh & Bidzilya, 2006) (Uzbekistan)
