= Scrobipalpa alia =

Scientific classification
- Domain: Eukaryota
- Kingdom: Animalia
- Phylum: Arthropoda
- Class: Insecta
- Order: Lepidoptera
- Family: Gelechiidae
- Genus: Scrobipalpa
- Species: S. alia

Binomial name
- Scrobipalpa alia (Falkovitsh & Bidzilya, 2006)

Synonyms
- Euscrobipalpa alia Falkovitsh & Bidzilya, 2006

Species of moth

Scrobipalpa alia is a moth in the family Gelechiidae. It was described by Mark I. Falkovitsh and Oleksiy V. Bidzilya in 2006. It is found in south-eastern Kazakhstan.

The wingspan is 13–14 mm (0.51–0.55 in).

The larvae feed on Kalidium caspicum.
