= Scrobipalpa pseudolutea =

Scientific classification
- Kingdom: Animalia
- Phylum: Arthropoda
- Clade: Pancrustacea
- Class: Insecta
- Order: Lepidoptera
- Family: Gelechiidae
- Genus: Scrobipalpa
- Species: S. pseudolutea

Binomial name
- Scrobipalpa pseudolutea Piskunov, 1990

Synonyms
- Euscrobipalpa pseudolutea

Species of moth

Scrobipalpa pseudolutea is a moth in the family Gelechiidae, described by Piskunov in 1990 from Ningxia (China).
