= Scrobipalpa manchurica =

Scientific classification
- Kingdom: Animalia
- Phylum: Arthropoda
- Clade: Pancrustacea
- Class: Insecta
- Order: Lepidoptera
- Family: Gelechiidae
- Genus: Scrobipalpa
- Species: S. manchurica

Binomial name
- Scrobipalpa manchurica (Matsumura, 1931)

Synonyms
- Phthorimaea manchurica Matsumura, 1931

Species of moth

Scrobipalpa manchurica is a moth in the family Gelechiidae. It was described by Shōnen Matsumura in 1931. It is found in Manchuria.
