= Scrobipalpa puplesisi =

Scientific classification
- Kingdom: Animalia
- Phylum: Arthropoda
- Clade: Pancrustacea
- Class: Insecta
- Order: Lepidoptera
- Family: Gelechiidae
- Genus: Scrobipalpa
- Species: S. puplesisi

Binomial name
- Scrobipalpa puplesisi Piskunov, 1990

Species of moth

Scrobipalpa puplesisi is a moth in the family Gelechiidae. It was described by Piskunov in 1990. It is found in Mongolia.
