= Scrobipalpa audax =

Scientific classification
- Kingdom: Animalia
- Phylum: Arthropoda
- Clade: Pancrustacea
- Class: Insecta
- Order: Lepidoptera
- Family: Gelechiidae
- Genus: Scrobipalpa
- Species: S. audax

Binomial name
- Scrobipalpa audax Povolný, 1966

Species of moth

Scrobipalpa audax is a moth in the family Gelechiidae. It was described by Dalibor Povolný in 1966. It is found in Algeria.

The length of the forewings is about 5 mm (0.20 in).
