= Scrobipalpa libanonica =

Scientific classification
- Kingdom: Animalia
- Phylum: Arthropoda
- Clade: Pancrustacea
- Class: Insecta
- Order: Lepidoptera
- Family: Gelechiidae
- Genus: Scrobipalpa
- Species: S. libanonica

Binomial name
- Scrobipalpa libanonica Povolný, 1966

Species of moth

Scrobipalpa libanonica is a moth in the family Gelechiidae. It was described by Dalibor Povolný in 1966. It is found in Lebanon.

The length of the forewings is about 6 mm (0.24 in). The forewings are covered with mixed whitish grey-tipped scales. The hindwings are silvery grey-whitish.
