= Scrobipalpa eschatopis =

Scientific classification
- Kingdom: Animalia
- Phylum: Arthropoda
- Class: Insecta
- Order: Lepidoptera
- Family: Gelechiidae
- Genus: Scrobipalpa
- Species: S. eschatopis

Binomial name
- Scrobipalpa eschatopis (Meyrick, 1904)

Synonyms
- Gnorimoschema eschatopis Meyrick, 1904

Species of moth

Scrobipalpa eschatopis is a moth in the family Gelechiidae. It was described by Edward Meyrick in 1904. It is found in Australia, where it has been recorded form Western Australia.

The wingspan is about 7 mm (0.28 in). The forewings are silvery whitish, suffused with pale whitish ochreous, and sprinkled with pale grey. There are two or three faint dots of grey sprinkling towards the costa anteriorly and the stigmata are formed of three or four black speckles, the plical obliquely before the first discal. The hindwings are grey whitish.
