= Scrobipalpa perinoides =

Scientific classification
- Kingdom: Animalia
- Phylum: Arthropoda
- Clade: Pancrustacea
- Class: Insecta
- Order: Lepidoptera
- Family: Gelechiidae
- Genus: Scrobipalpa
- Species: S. perinoides

Binomial name
- Scrobipalpa perinoides Povolný, 1967

Species of moth

Scrobipalpa perinoides is a moth in the family Gelechiidae. It was described by Povolný in 1967. It is found in Saudi Arabia.
