= Scrobipalpa erichiodes =

Scientific classification
- Domain: Eukaryota
- Kingdom: Animalia
- Phylum: Arthropoda
- Class: Insecta
- Order: Lepidoptera
- Family: Gelechiidae
- Genus: Scrobipalpa
- Species: S. erichiodes

Binomial name
- Scrobipalpa erichiodes Bidzilya & Li, 2010

Species of moth

Scrobipalpa erichiodes is a moth in the family Gelechiidae. It was described by Oleksiy V. Bidzilya and Hou-Hun Li in 2010. It is found in China in Gansu, Hebei, Heilongjiang, Ningxia, Inner Mongolia, Shaanxi and Xinjiang.

The wingspan is 9–10 mm (0.35–0.39 in).

The larvae have been recorded feeding on Lycium barbarum.

== Etymology ==
The species name refers to the close relationship with Scrobipalpa erichi.
