= Scrobipalpa bifasciata =

Scientific classification
- Kingdom: Animalia
- Phylum: Arthropoda
- Clade: Pancrustacea
- Class: Insecta
- Order: Lepidoptera
- Family: Gelechiidae
- Genus: Scrobipalpa
- Species: S. bifasciata

Binomial name
- Scrobipalpa bifasciata Povolný, 1971

Species of moth

Scrobipalpa bifasciata is a moth in the family Gelechiidae. It was described by Dalibor Povolný in 1971. It is found in Algeria.

The length of the forewings is about 4 mm (0.16 in). The forewings are nearly pure white with a few gold-brown scales. The hindwings are white.
