= Scrobipalpa vartianorum =

Scientific classification
- Kingdom: Animalia
- Phylum: Arthropoda
- Clade: Pancrustacea
- Class: Insecta
- Order: Lepidoptera
- Family: Gelechiidae
- Genus: Scrobipalpa
- Species: S. vartianorum

Binomial name
- Scrobipalpa vartianorum Povolný, 1968

Species of moth

Scrobipalpa vartianorum is a moth in the family Gelechiidae. It was described by Povolný in 1968. It is found in China (Xinjiang) and northern Iran.
