= Scrobipalpa albofusca =

Scientific classification
- Kingdom: Animalia
- Phylum: Arthropoda
- Clade: Pancrustacea
- Class: Insecta
- Order: Lepidoptera
- Family: Gelechiidae
- Genus: Scrobipalpa
- Species: S. albofusca

Binomial name
- Scrobipalpa albofusca Povolný, 1971

Species of moth

Scrobipalpa albofusca is a moth in the family Gelechiidae. It was described by Dalibor Povolný in 1971. It is found in Algeria.

The length of the forewings is 5–6 mm (0.20–0.24 in). The forewings are ochreous-whitish to cream-whitish with sparse dark grey to blackish groups of scales. The hindwings are nearly white, often shining silvery. The host plant is Atriplex halimus (Amaranthaceae).
