= Scrobipalpa ochrostigma =

Scientific classification
- Domain: Eukaryota
- Kingdom: Animalia
- Phylum: Arthropoda
- Class: Insecta
- Order: Lepidoptera
- Family: Gelechiidae
- Genus: Scrobipalpa
- Species: S. ochrostigma

Binomial name
- Scrobipalpa ochrostigma Bidzilya & Li, 2010

Species of moth

Scrobipalpa ochrostigma is a moth in the family Gelechiidae. It was described by Oleksiy V. Bidzilya and Hou-Hun Li in 2010. It is found in the Chinese provinces of Gansu and Qinghai.

The wingspan is about 13.5 mm (0.53 in). Adults are on wing in August.

== Etymology ==
The species name refers to the wing pattern and is derived from Greek ochra (meaning ochreous) and stigma (meaning marks).
