= Scrobipalpa pendens =

Scientific classification
- Kingdom: Animalia
- Phylum: Arthropoda
- Class: Insecta
- Order: Lepidoptera
- Family: Gelechiidae
- Genus: Scrobipalpa
- Species: S. pendens

Binomial name
- Scrobipalpa pendens (Meyrick, 1918)

Synonyms
- Phthorimaea pendens Meyrick, 1918

Species of moth

Scrobipalpa pendens is a moth in the family Gelechiidae. It was described by Edward Meyrick in 1918. It is found in South Africa.

The wingspan is about 14 mm (0.55 in). The forewings are reddish ochreous, paler towards the base, with a few scattered black scales and a blackish dot towards the base above the middle, one in the middle beyond this, and one still further on beneath the fold. There is an irregular oblique grey streak sprinkled with black from the costa at one-fourth to below the middle, interrupted beneath the costa, angulated and continued upwards to the costa at three-fourths, and a similar streak from the middle of the costa crossing this and also below the middle angulated upwards to touch it again just beyond the second discal stigma. The stigmata are rather large and black, the plical somewhat before the first discal, these placed on the margins of the angle of the first streak, the second discal on the posterior arm of the first streak. There is some grey sprinkling along the upper half of the termen. The hindwings are light slaty grey.
