= Scrobipalpa notata =

Scientific classification
- Kingdom: Animalia
- Phylum: Arthropoda
- Clade: Pancrustacea
- Class: Insecta
- Order: Lepidoptera
- Family: Gelechiidae
- Genus: Scrobipalpa
- Species: S. notata

Binomial name
- Scrobipalpa notata (Povolný, 2001)

Synonyms
- Euscrobipalpa notata Povolný, 2001

Species of moth

Scrobipalpa notata is a moth of the family Gelechiidae. It is found in Ukraine (Crimea) and Russia (the southern Ural).
