= Scrobipalpa caryocoloides =

Scientific classification
- Kingdom: Animalia
- Phylum: Arthropoda
- Clade: Pancrustacea
- Class: Insecta
- Order: Lepidoptera
- Family: Gelechiidae
- Genus: Scrobipalpa
- Species: S. caryocoloides

Binomial name
- Scrobipalpa caryocoloides Povolný, 1977

Species of moth

Scrobipalpa caryocoloides is a moth in the family Gelechiidae. It was described by Povolný in 1977. It is found in Korea, Japan and China (Ningxia, Shaanxi).

The wingspan is 7–8 mm (0.28–0.31 in).
