= Scrobipalpa anatolica =

Scientific classification
- Kingdom: Animalia
- Phylum: Arthropoda
- Clade: Pancrustacea
- Class: Insecta
- Order: Lepidoptera
- Family: Gelechiidae
- Genus: Scrobipalpa
- Species: S. anatolica

Binomial name
- Scrobipalpa anatolica Povolný, 1973

Species of moth

Scrobipalpa anatolica is a moth in the family Gelechiidae. It was described by Povolný in 1973. It is found in Turkey.

The length of the forewings is about 7 mm (0.28 in). The ground colour of the forewings is uniform cream grey-whitish. The hindwings are grey, lightly shining.
