= Scrobipalpa montafghana =

Scientific classification
- Kingdom: Animalia
- Phylum: Arthropoda
- Clade: Pancrustacea
- Class: Insecta
- Order: Lepidoptera
- Family: Gelechiidae
- Genus: Scrobipalpa
- Species: S. montafghana

Binomial name
- Scrobipalpa montafghana Povolný, 1968

Species of moth

Scrobipalpa montafghana is a moth in the family Gelechiidae. It was described by Povolný in 1968. It is found in Afghanistan.
