= Scrobipalpa corsicamontes =

Scientific classification
- Domain: Eukaryota
- Kingdom: Animalia
- Phylum: Arthropoda
- Class: Insecta
- Order: Lepidoptera
- Family: Gelechiidae
- Genus: Scrobipalpa
- Species: S. corsicamontes

Binomial name
- Scrobipalpa corsicamontes Varenne & Nel, 2013

Species of moth

Scrobipalpa corsicamontes is a moth in the family Gelechiidae. It was described by Thierry Varenne and Jacques Nel in 2013. It is found on Corsica.
