= Scrobipalpa smithi =

Scientific classification
- Kingdom: Animalia
- Phylum: Arthropoda
- Clade: Pancrustacea
- Class: Insecta
- Order: Lepidoptera
- Family: Gelechiidae
- Genus: Scrobipalpa
- Species: S. smithi

Binomial name
- Scrobipalpa smithi Povolný & Bradley, 1965

Species of moth

Scrobipalpa smithi is a moth in the family Gelechiidae. It was described by Povolný and Bradley in 1965. It is found in Algeria, Spain, Ukraine, Turkey, Syria, Lebanon, China (Xinjiang) and Mongolia.

The length of the forewings is 5–6.5 mm (0.20–0.26 in).
