= Scrobipalpa bidzilyai =

Scientific classification
- Kingdom: Animalia
- Phylum: Arthropoda
- Clade: Pancrustacea
- Class: Insecta
- Order: Lepidoptera
- Family: Gelechiidae
- Genus: Scrobipalpa
- Species: S. bidzilyai

Binomial name
- Scrobipalpa bidzilyai (Povolný, 2001)

Synonyms
- Euscrobipalpa bidzilyai Povolný, 2001

Species of moth

Scrobipalpa bidzilyai is a moth in the family Gelechiidae. It was described by Povolný in 2001. It is found in China (Hebei) and Russia (Burjatia, Chitinskaya oblast).
