= Scrobipalpa paradoxa =

Scientific classification
- Kingdom: Animalia
- Phylum: Arthropoda
- Clade: Pancrustacea
- Class: Insecta
- Order: Lepidoptera
- Family: Gelechiidae
- Genus: Scrobipalpa
- Species: S. paradoxa

Binomial name
- Scrobipalpa paradoxa Piskunov, 1990

Synonyms
- Scrobipalpa (Euscrobipalpa) paradoxa Piskunov, 1990

Species of moth

Scrobipalpa paradoxa is a moth in the family Gelechiidae. It was described by Piskunov in 1990. It is found in China (Xinjiang), south-eastern Kazakhstan and Uzbekistan, where it was described from the Kyzylkum Desert in the Burkhara District.
