= Scrobipalpa aganophthalma =

Scientific classification
- Kingdom: Animalia
- Phylum: Arthropoda
- Class: Insecta
- Order: Lepidoptera
- Family: Gelechiidae
- Genus: Scrobipalpa
- Species: S. aganophthalma

Binomial name
- Scrobipalpa aganophthalma (Meyrick, 1931)

Synonyms
- Phthorimaea aganophthalma Meyrick, 1931

Species of moth

Scrobipalpa aganophthalma is a moth in the family Gelechiidae. It was described by Edward Meyrick in 1931. It is found in Tibet.
