= Scrobipalpa magnificella =

Scientific classification
- Kingdom: Animalia
- Phylum: Arthropoda
- Clade: Pancrustacea
- Class: Insecta
- Order: Lepidoptera
- Family: Gelechiidae
- Genus: Scrobipalpa
- Species: S. magnificella

Binomial name
- Scrobipalpa magnificella Povolný, 1967

Species of moth

Scrobipalpa magnificella is a moth of the family Gelechiidae. It is found in Russia (the southern Ural), Ukraine, Syria, Iran, Mongolia, Uzbekistan and China (Xinjiang).
