= Scrobipalpa chersophila =

Scientific classification
- Kingdom: Animalia
- Phylum: Arthropoda
- Class: Insecta
- Order: Lepidoptera
- Family: Gelechiidae
- Genus: Scrobipalpa
- Species: S. chersophila

Binomial name
- Scrobipalpa chersophila (Meyrick, 1909)

Synonyms
- Gelechia chersophila Meyrick, 1909

Species of moth

Scrobipalpa chersophila is a moth in the family Gelechiidae. It was described by Edward Meyrick in 1909. It is found in South Africa.

The wingspan is 12–13 mm (0.47–0.51 in). The forewings are light greyish ochreous or brownish ochreous, finely sprinkled with ferruginous, with scattered black scales, as well as a blackish dot in the middle of the base, and one on the costa near the base. A small black spot is found on the costa at one-fifth, tending to connect with a patch of black sprinkles in the disc obliquely beyond it, terminated beneath by small blackish plical stigma. The discal stigmata are blackish, the first small, obliquely beyond the plical, the second larger, elongate, its posterior extremity bent downwards. There is a small group of dark fuscous scales on the costa at two-thirds and similar groups at the tornus and apex, and a larger spot of dark fuscous suffusion near before the apex. Sometimes, one or two dark fuscous costal dots are found towards the apex. The hindwings are pale grey.
