= Scrobipalpa occulta =

Scientific classification
- Kingdom: Animalia
- Phylum: Arthropoda
- Clade: Pancrustacea
- Class: Insecta
- Order: Lepidoptera
- Family: Gelechiidae
- Genus: Scrobipalpa
- Species: S. occulta

Binomial name
- Scrobipalpa occulta (Povolný, 2002)

Synonyms
- Euscrobipalpa occulta Povolný, 2002; Scrobipalpa sibirica Bidzilya, 2009

Species of moth

Scrobipalpa occulta is a moth in the family Gelechiidae. It was described by Povolný in 2002. It is found in Turkey, the Altai Mountains and the southern Ural Mountains.
