= Scrobipalpa cultrata =

Scientific classification
- Kingdom: Animalia
- Phylum: Arthropoda
- Clade: Pancrustacea
- Class: Insecta
- Order: Lepidoptera
- Family: Gelechiidae
- Genus: Scrobipalpa
- Species: S. cultrata

Binomial name
- Scrobipalpa cultrata Povolný, 1971

Species of moth

Scrobipalpa cultrata is a moth in the family Gelechiidae. It was described by Dalibor Povolný in 1971. It is found in Algeria and northern Iran.

The length of the forewings is 4.5–5 mm (0.18–0.20 in). The host plant is Salicornia vermiculata (Amaranthaceae).
