= Scrobipalpa hyssopi =

Scientific classification
- Domain: Eukaryota
- Kingdom: Animalia
- Phylum: Arthropoda
- Class: Insecta
- Order: Lepidoptera
- Family: Gelechiidae
- Genus: Scrobipalpa
- Species: S. hyssopi

Binomial name
- Scrobipalpa hyssopi Nel, 2003

Species of moth

Scrobipalpa hyssopi is a moth in the family Gelechiidae. It was described by Jacques Nel in 2003. It is found in the Hautes-Alpes of southern France.

The larvae feed on Hyssopus officinalis.
