= Scrobipalpa lutea =

Scientific classification
- Kingdom: Animalia
- Phylum: Arthropoda
- Clade: Pancrustacea
- Class: Insecta
- Order: Lepidoptera
- Family: Gelechiidae
- Genus: Scrobipalpa
- Species: S. lutea

Binomial name
- Scrobipalpa lutea Povolný, 1977

Species of moth

Scrobipalpa lutea is a moth of the family Gelechiidae. It is found in Russia (the southern Ural) and Turkey.
