= Scrobipalpa otregata =

Scientific classification
- Kingdom: Animalia
- Phylum: Arthropoda
- Clade: Pancrustacea
- Class: Insecta
- Order: Lepidoptera
- Family: Gelechiidae
- Genus: Scrobipalpa
- Species: S. otregata

Binomial name
- Scrobipalpa otregata Povolný, 1972

Species of moth

Scrobipalpa otregata is a moth in the family Gelechiidae. It was described by Povolný in 1972. It is found in northern Iran and Palestine.
