= Scrobipalpa hoenei =

Scientific classification
- Domain: Eukaryota
- Kingdom: Animalia
- Phylum: Arthropoda
- Class: Insecta
- Order: Lepidoptera
- Family: Gelechiidae
- Genus: Scrobipalpa
- Species: S. hoenei

Binomial name
- Scrobipalpa hoenei Bidzilya & Li, 2010

Species of moth

Scrobipalpa hoenei is a moth in the family Gelechiidae. It was described by Oleksiy V. Bidzilya and Hou-Hun Li in 2010. It is found in Yunnan, China.
