= Scrobipalpa argenteonigra =

Scientific classification
- Kingdom: Animalia
- Phylum: Arthropoda
- Clade: Pancrustacea
- Class: Insecta
- Order: Lepidoptera
- Family: Gelechiidae
- Genus: Scrobipalpa
- Species: S. argenteonigra

Binomial name
- Scrobipalpa argenteonigra Povolný, 1972

Synonyms
- Euscrobipalpa argenteonigra halocnemi Falkovitsh & Bidzilya, 2006

Species of moth

Scrobipalpa argenteonigra is a moth in the family Gelechiidae. It was described by Povolný in 1972. It is found in northern Iran.

== Subspecies ==
- Scrobipalpa argenteonigra argenteonigra
- Scrobipalpa argenteonigra halocnemi (Falkovitsh & Bidzilya, 2006) (Uzbekistan, south-eastern Kazakhstan)
