= Scrobipalpa zizera =

Scientific classification
- Kingdom: Animalia
- Phylum: Arthropoda
- Clade: Pancrustacea
- Class: Insecta
- Order: Lepidoptera
- Family: Gelechiidae
- Genus: Scrobipalpa
- Species: S. zizera

Binomial name
- Scrobipalpa zizera Povolný, 1969

Species of moth

Scrobipalpa zizera is a moth in the family Gelechiidae. It was described by Povolný in 1969. It is found in Mongolia.
