= Scrobipalpa moghrebanella =

Scientific classification
- Domain: Eukaryota
- Kingdom: Animalia
- Phylum: Arthropoda
- Class: Insecta
- Order: Lepidoptera
- Family: Gelechiidae
- Genus: Scrobipalpa
- Species: S. moghrebanella

Binomial name
- Scrobipalpa moghrebanella (D. Lucas, 1937)

Synonyms
- Lita moghrebanella D. Lucas, 1937

Species of moth

Scrobipalpa moghrebanella is a moth in the family Gelechiidae. It was described by Daniel Lucas in 1937. It is found in Morocco.
