= Scrobipalpa concerna =

Scientific classification
- Kingdom: Animalia
- Phylum: Arthropoda
- Clade: Pancrustacea
- Class: Insecta
- Order: Lepidoptera
- Family: Gelechiidae
- Genus: Scrobipalpa
- Species: S. concerna

Binomial name
- Scrobipalpa concerna Povolný, 1969

Synonyms
- Euscrobipalpa concerna uzbeka Falkovitsh & Bidzilya, 2006

Species of moth

Scrobipalpa concerna is a moth in the family Gelechiidae. It was described by Povolný in 1969. It is found in Mongolia.

== Subspecies ==
- Scrobipalpa concerna concerna
- Scrobipalpa concerna uzbeka (Falkovitsh & Bidzilya, 2006) (Uzbekistan)
