= Scrobipalpa fusca =

Scientific classification
- Domain: Eukaryota
- Kingdom: Animalia
- Phylum: Arthropoda
- Class: Insecta
- Order: Lepidoptera
- Family: Gelechiidae
- Genus: Scrobipalpa
- Species: S. fusca

Binomial name
- Scrobipalpa fusca Bidzilya & Li, 2010

Species of moth

Scrobipalpa fusca is a moth in the family Gelechiidae. It was described by Oleksiy V. Bidzilya and Hou-Hun Li in 2010. It is found in China (Xinjiang), Mongolia, Uzbekistan, Turkmenistan and south-eastern Kazakhstan.

The wingspan is 9.5–10.5 mm (0.37–0.41 in). Adults are on wing from the end of April to July.
