= Scrobipalpa latiuncella =

Scientific classification
- Domain: Eukaryota
- Kingdom: Animalia
- Phylum: Arthropoda
- Class: Insecta
- Order: Lepidoptera
- Family: Gelechiidae
- Genus: Scrobipalpa
- Species: S. latiuncella

Binomial name
- Scrobipalpa latiuncella Bidzilya & Li, 2010

Species of moth

Scrobipalpa latiuncella is a moth in the family Gelechiidae. It was described by Oleksiy V. Bidzilya and Hou-Hun Li in 2010. It is found in Ningxia, China.

The wingspan is about 7 mm (0.28 in). Adults are on wing in early June.

== Etymology ==
The species name refers to the broad uncus in the male genitalia and is derived from Latin latus (meaning broad).
