= Scrobipalpa inferna =

Scientific classification
- Kingdom: Animalia
- Phylum: Arthropoda
- Clade: Pancrustacea
- Class: Insecta
- Order: Lepidoptera
- Family: Gelechiidae
- Genus: Scrobipalpa
- Species: S. inferna

Binomial name
- Scrobipalpa inferna Povolný, 1973

Species of moth

Scrobipalpa inferna is a moth in the family Gelechiidae. It was described by Povolný in 1973. It is found in Mongolia.
