= Scrobipalpa nomias =

Scientific classification
- Kingdom: Animalia
- Phylum: Arthropoda
- Class: Insecta
- Order: Lepidoptera
- Family: Gelechiidae
- Genus: Scrobipalpa
- Species: S. nomias

Binomial name
- Scrobipalpa nomias (Meyrick, 1921)

Synonyms
- Phthorimaea nomias Meyrick, 1921

Species of moth

Scrobipalpa nomias is a moth in the family Gelechiidae. It was described by Edward Meyrick in 1921. It is found in South Africa.

The wingspan is about 13 mm (0.51 in). The forewings are fuscous suffusedly sprinkled with dark grey. The stigmata are blackish, the plical obliquely before the first discal. There is an obscure brownish line along the fold and a longitudinal streak of dark fuscous suffusion from beyond the second discal stigma to near the apex. The hindwings are rather bluish grey.
