= Scrobipalpa dagmaris =

Scientific classification
- Kingdom: Animalia
- Phylum: Arthropoda
- Clade: Pancrustacea
- Class: Insecta
- Order: Lepidoptera
- Family: Gelechiidae
- Genus: Scrobipalpa
- Species: S. dagmaris

Binomial name
- Scrobipalpa dagmaris Povolný, 1987

Synonyms
- Scrobipalpa (Euscrobipalpa) dagmaris Povolný, 1987; Scrobipalpa rezniki Piskunov, 1990; Scrobipalpa rezniki turkmenica Piskunov, 1990

Species of moth

Scrobipalpa dagmaris is a moth in the family Gelechiidae. It was described by Povolný in 1987. It is found in Uzbekistan, Turkmenistan and Mongolia. Although the type location is northern Italy, the species is probably not found in Europe. The type location was probably mistakenly given as Italy.

The length of the forewings is about 6 mm (0.24 in).

The larvae feed on Haloxylon persicum.
