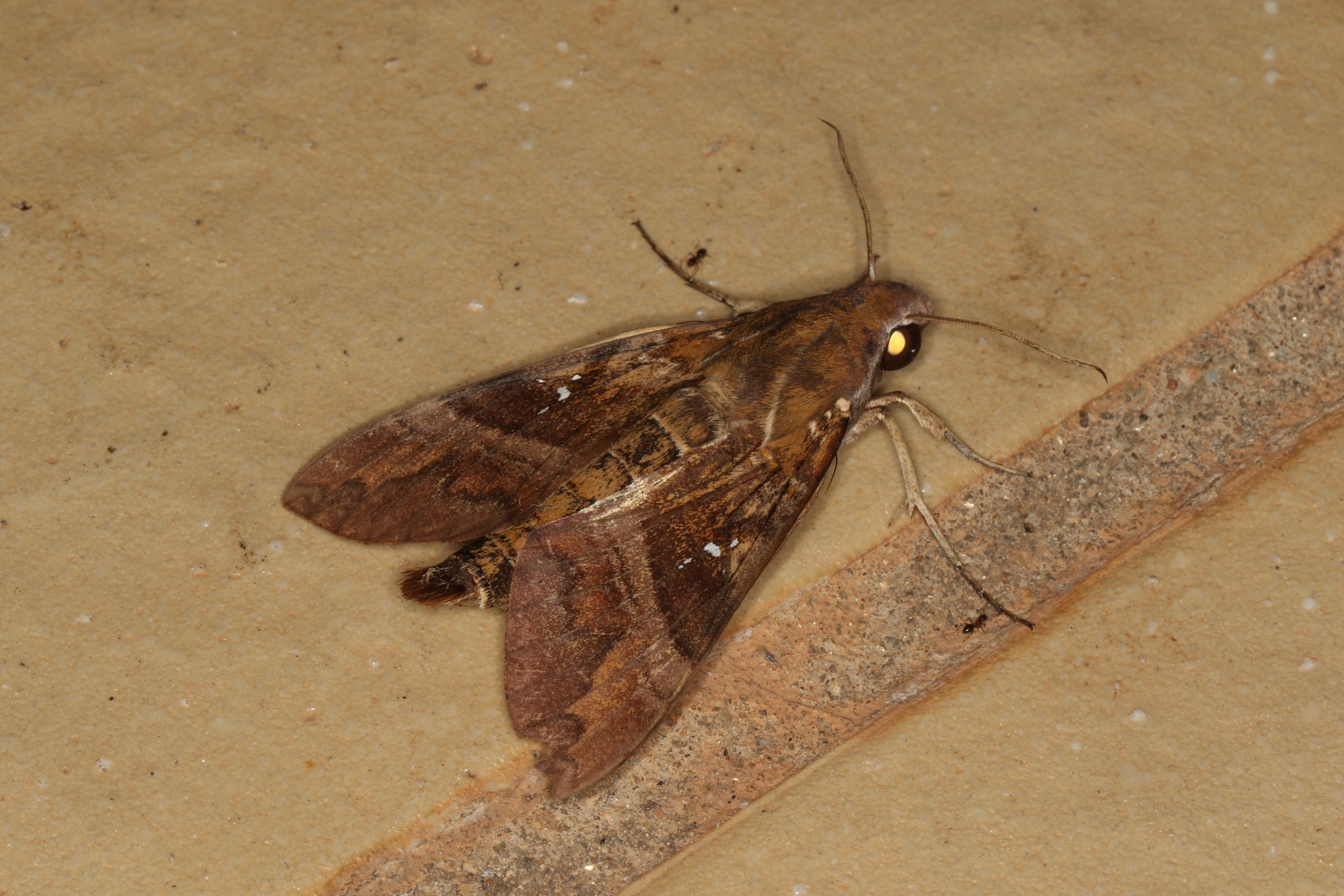

Scientific classification
- Kingdom: Animalia
- Phylum: Arthropoda
- Class: Insecta
- Order: Lepidoptera
- Family: Sphingidae
- Genus: Nephele
- Species: N. densoi

Binomial name
- Nephele densoi (Keferstein, 1870)

Synonyms
- Zonilia densoi Keferstein, 1870; Zonilia malgassica R. Felder, 1874; Zonilia rhadama Boisduval, 1875

= Nephele densoi =

Species of moth

Nephele densoi is a moth of the family Sphingidae. It is known from Madagascar and the Comoro Islands.

The larvae feed on Nerium oleander, Ficus benghalensis and Ficus reflexa.
