= Isophrictis kefersteiniellus =

Scientific classification
- Domain: Eukaryota
- Kingdom: Animalia
- Phylum: Arthropoda
- Class: Insecta
- Order: Lepidoptera
- Family: Gelechiidae
- Genus: Isophrictis
- Species: I. kefersteiniellus

Binomial name
- Isophrictis kefersteiniellus (Zeller, [1850])

Synonyms
- Ypsolophus kefersteiniellus Zeller, [1850]; Paltodora senicula Meyrick, 1913; Isophrictis leptidella Turati, 1924

Species of moth

Isophrictis kefersteiniellus is a moth of the family Gelechiidae. It was described by Zeller in 1850. It is found in Greece, Crete, North Macedonia, Malta, Italy, France, Spain and Portugal. Outside of Europe, it is found in Libya, Tunisia, Asia Minor and Palestine.

== Etymology ==
The species is named in honour of Georg Adolf Keferstein.
