= Isophrictis cilialineella =

Scientific classification
- Kingdom: Animalia
- Phylum: Arthropoda
- Clade: Pancrustacea
- Class: Insecta
- Order: Lepidoptera
- Family: Gelechiidae
- Genus: Isophrictis
- Species: I. cilialineella

Binomial name
- Isophrictis cilialineella (Chambers, 1874)

Synonyms
- Gelechia cilialineella Chambers, 1874

Species of moth

Isophrictis cilialineella is a moth of the family Gelechiidae. It was described by Vactor Tousey Chambers in 1874. It is found in North America, where it has been recorded from Texas.

Adults are similar to Isophrictis similiella. The forewings are ochreous, tinged slightly with grayish and with an indistinct brownish spot on the fold and another a little behind it on the disc and one in the apical part of the wing.
