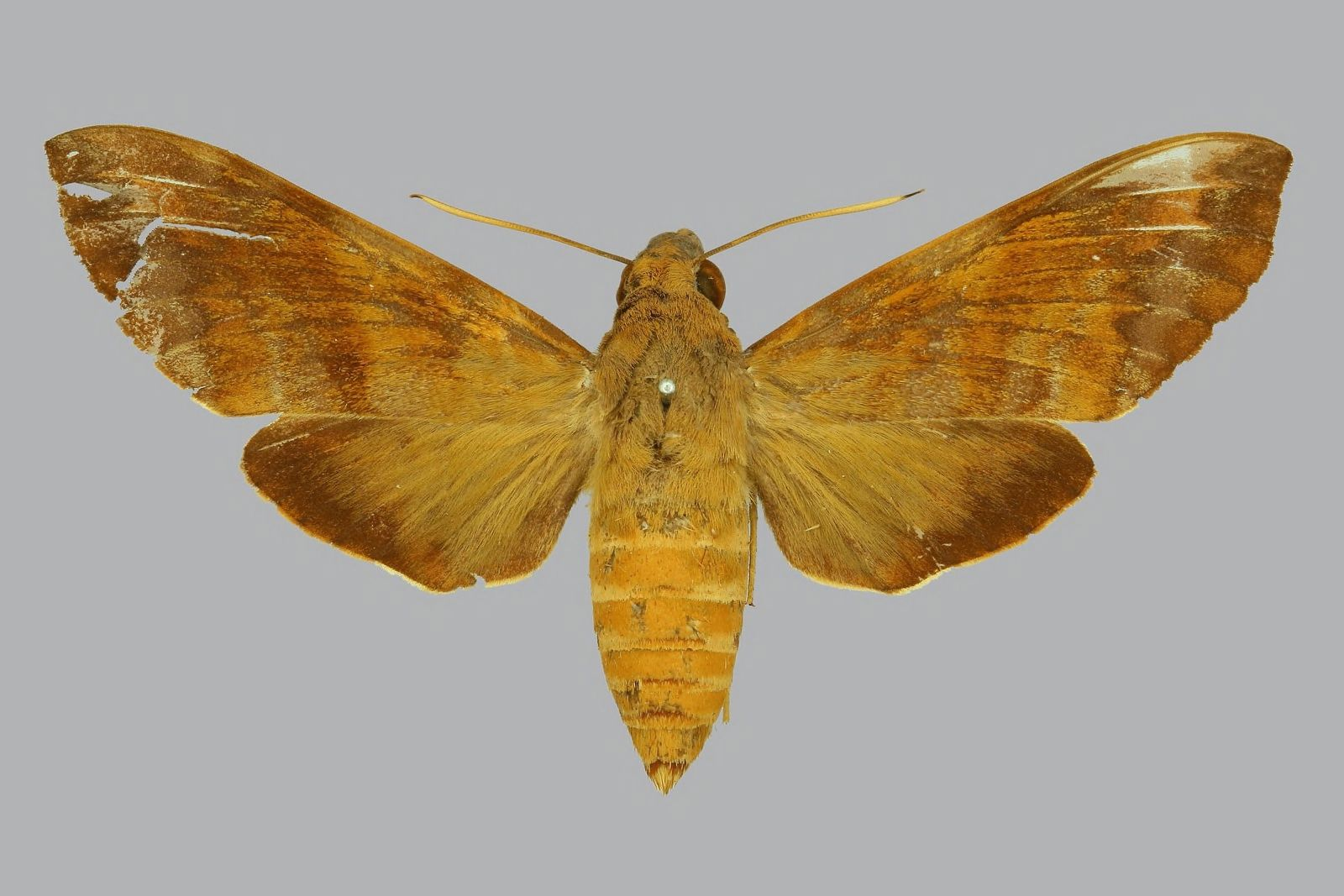

Scientific classification
- Kingdom: Animalia
- Phylum: Arthropoda
- Class: Insecta
- Order: Lepidoptera
- Family: Sphingidae
- Genus: Nephele
- Species: N. leighi

Binomial name
- Nephele leighi Joicey & Talbot, 1921

= Nephele leighi =

Species of moth

Nephele leighi is a moth of the family Sphingidae. It is known from the Seychelles.
