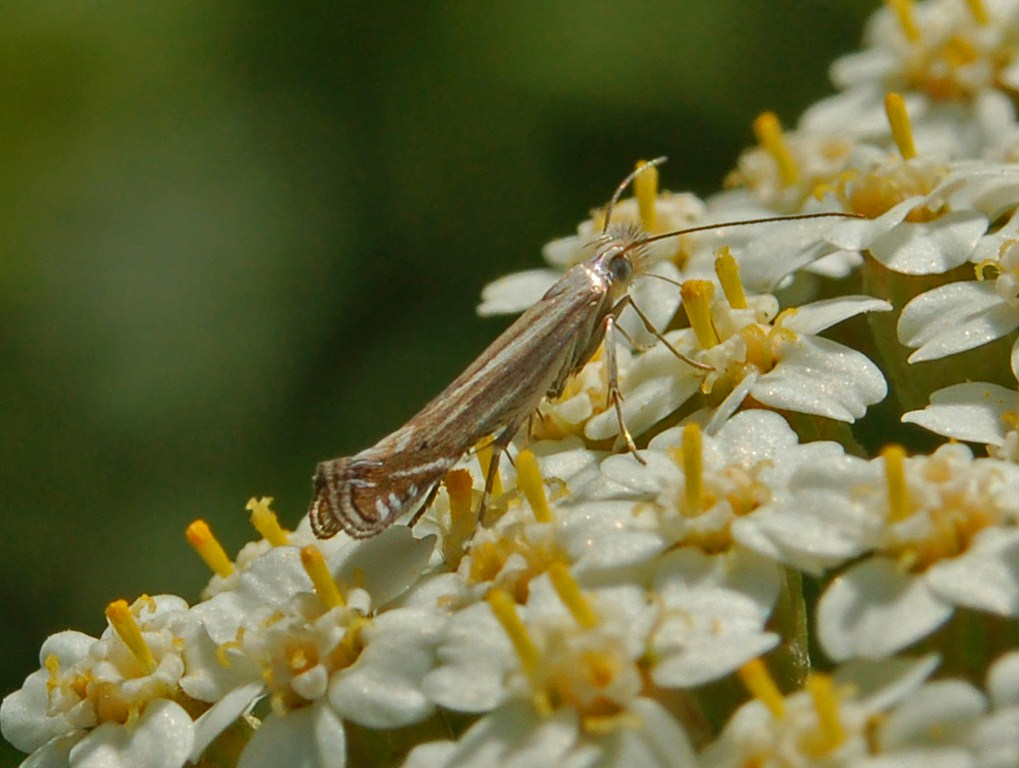

Scientific classification
- Domain: Eukaryota
- Kingdom: Animalia
- Phylum: Arthropoda
- Class: Insecta
- Order: Lepidoptera
- Family: Gelechiidae
- Genus: Isophrictis
- Species: I. striatella

Binomial name
- Isophrictis striatella (Denis & Schiffermuller, 1775)

Synonyms
- Tinea striatella Denis & Schiffermuller, 1775; Tinea tanacetella Schrank, 1802; Paltodora striatella var. substriatella Caradja, 1920

= Isophrictis striatella =

Species of moth

Isophrictis striatella is a moth of the family Gelechiidae. It is found in most of Europe, as well as Turkey and North America.

The wingspan is about 12 mm. Adults are on wing from mid June until September.

The larvae feed on Tanacetum vulgare, Achillea ptarmica and Artemisia vulgaris.
