= Isophrictis trimaculella =

Scientific classification
- Kingdom: Animalia
- Phylum: Arthropoda
- Class: Insecta
- Order: Lepidoptera
- Family: Gelechiidae
- Genus: Isophrictis
- Species: I. trimaculella

Binomial name
- Isophrictis trimaculella (Chambers, 1874)

Synonyms
- Anarsia trimaculella Chambers, 1874; Ypsolophus touceyellus Busck, 1903

Species of moth

Isophrictis trimaculella is a moth of the family Gelechiidae. It was described by Vactor Tousey Chambers in 1874. It is found in North America, where it has been recorded from Kentucky and Texas.

The forewings are ochreous, suffused and dusted with brown and with a small dark brown spot on the fold before the middle. There is also a larger one at the middle of the disc and one at its end. Some scattered dark brown scales are found along the base of the dorsal cilia, near the apex.
