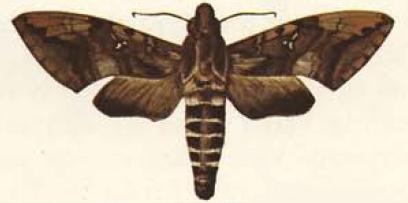

Scientific classification
- Kingdom: Animalia
- Phylum: Arthropoda
- Class: Insecta
- Order: Lepidoptera
- Family: Sphingidae
- Genus: Nephele
- Species: N. accentifera

Binomial name
- Nephele accentifera (Palisot de Beauvois, 1821)

Synonyms
- Sphinx accentifera Palisot de Beauvois, 1821; Sphinx tridyma van der Hoeven, 1840; Deilephila ranzani Bertoloni, 1850; Nephele variegata Butler, 1875

= Nephele accentifera =

Accented hawk

Species of moth

Nephele accentifera, the accented hawk, is a moth of the family Sphingidae. The species was first described by Palisot de Beauvois in 1821. It is common in most habitats throughout the Ethiopian Region, excluding Madagascar and the Cape Peninsula.

== Diet ==
The larvae feed on the leaves of Ficus sur and Ficus natalensis.
