= Isophrictis magnella =

Scientific classification
- Domain: Eukaryota
- Kingdom: Animalia
- Phylum: Arthropoda
- Class: Insecta
- Order: Lepidoptera
- Family: Gelechiidae
- Genus: Isophrictis
- Species: I. magnella

Binomial name
- Isophrictis magnella (Busck, 1903)

Synonyms
- Paltodora magnella Busck, 1903

Species of moth

Isophrictis magnella is a moth of the family Gelechiidae. It was described by August Busck in 1903. It is found in North America, where it has been recorded from California, Colorado, Maryland, Massachusetts, Oklahoma, Ontario and Tennessee.

The wingspan is 15.5-16.5 mm. The forewings are yellowish gray, with the outer two-thirds of the costal edge white and with a small black spot on the fold and two elongated black white-edged dashes on the middle of the wing in continuation of each other, sometimes forming one uninterrupted black line. From the apical fourth of the costa, a thin oblique white line runs outward to the termen. Above this, four white dashes are found in the costal cilia, and opposite it correspondingly a dorsal white line emitting three white pencils into the dorsal cilia. The hindwings are dark gray.

The larvae feed on Hazardia squarrosa.
