= Isophrictis dietziella =

Scientific classification
- Domain: Eukaryota
- Kingdom: Animalia
- Phylum: Arthropoda
- Class: Insecta
- Order: Lepidoptera
- Family: Gelechiidae
- Genus: Isophrictis
- Species: I. dietziella

Binomial name
- Isophrictis dietziella (Busck, 1903)

Synonyms
- Paltodora dietziella Busck, 1903

Species of moth

Isophrictis dietziella is a moth of the family Gelechiidae. It was described by August Busck in 1903. It is found in North America, where it has been recorded from Colorado and California.

The wingspan is about 16 mm. The forewings are fawn colored, at the base concolorous with the thorax, but becoming deeper toward the tip. There is a small black streak on the fold at the middle of the wing and a small black dot at the end of the disk. A thin white line is found at the beginning of the costal cilia, running obliquely outward across the tip of the wing. Opposite it, from the dorsal edge, another thin white line is curved upward and outward, nearly but not quite meeting the costal streak at the dorsal edge near the tip. Both are continued out into and meet in the dorsal cilia, which is yellowish fuscous and contains two other white pencils below the continuation of the streaks. The hindwings are dark fuscous.
