= Tritonaclia melania =

Scientific classification
- Kingdom: Animalia
- Phylum: Arthropoda
- Clade: Pancrustacea
- Class: Insecta
- Order: Lepidoptera
- Superfamily: Noctuoidea
- Family: Erebidae
- Subfamily: Arctiinae
- Genus: Tritonaclia
- Species: T. melania

Binomial name
- Tritonaclia melania (Oberthür, 1923)

Synonyms
- Naclia melania Oberthür, 1923

Species of moth

Tritonaclia melania is a moth in the subfamily Arctiinae. It was described by Oberthür in 1923. It is found in Madagascar.
