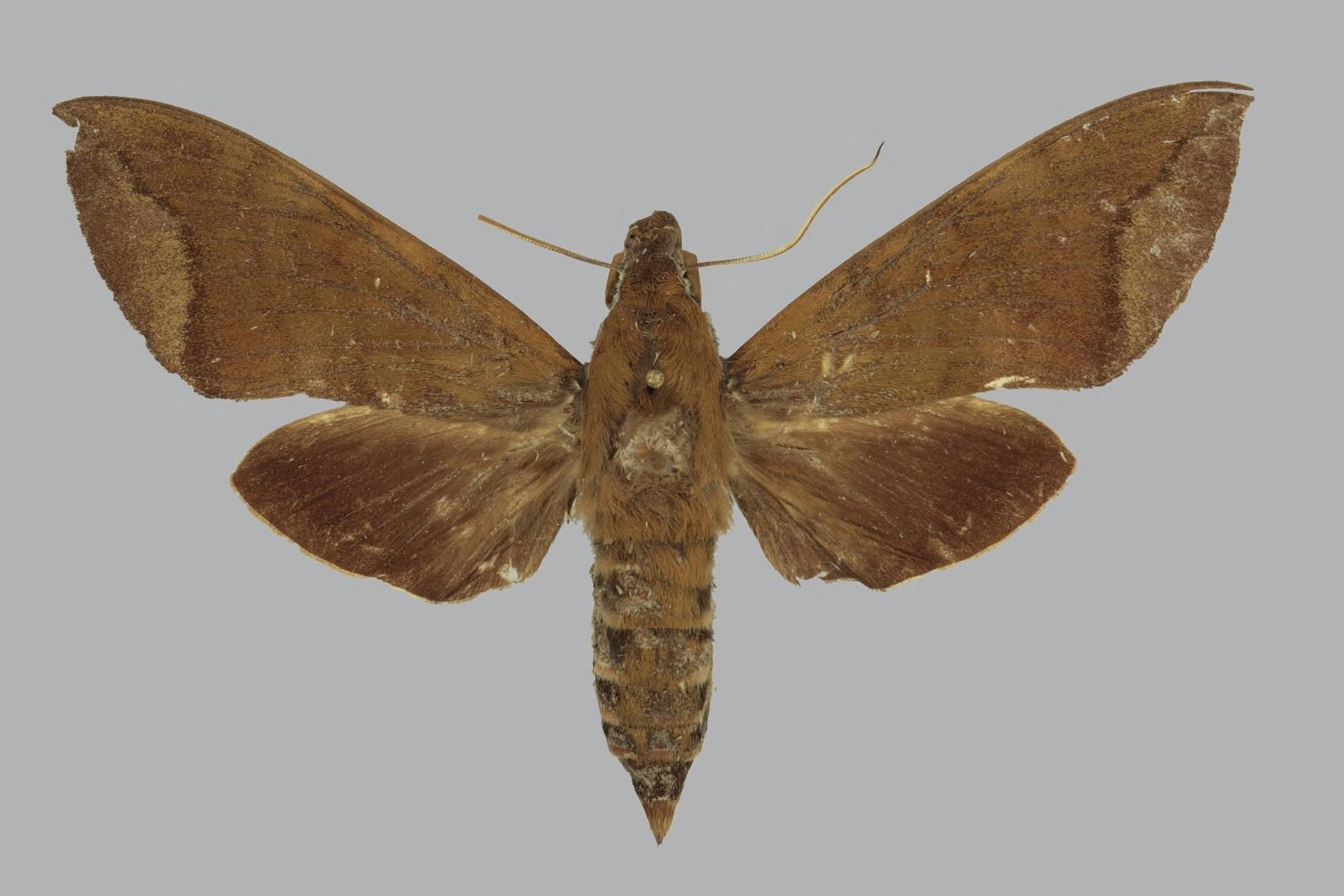

Scientific classification
- Kingdom: Animalia
- Phylum: Arthropoda
- Class: Insecta
- Order: Lepidoptera
- Family: Sphingidae
- Genus: Nephele
- Species: N. joiceyi

Binomial name
- Nephele joiceyi Clark, 1923

= Nephele joiceyi =

Species of moth

Nephele joiceyi is a moth of the family Sphingidae. It is known from Indonesia (including Sumatra).
