= Isophrictis meridionella =

Scientific classification
- Domain: Eukaryota
- Kingdom: Animalia
- Phylum: Arthropoda
- Class: Insecta
- Order: Lepidoptera
- Family: Gelechiidae
- Genus: Isophrictis
- Species: I. meridionella

Binomial name
- Isophrictis meridionella (Herrich-Schäffer, 1854)

Synonyms
- Eupleuris meridionella Herrich-Schäffer, 1854

Species of moth

Isophrictis meridionella is a moth of the family Gelechiidae. It was described by Gottlieb August Wilhelm Herrich-Schäffer in 1854. It is found in Spain, France and on Sardinia.

The forewings are ash grey, the margin broadly rust yellowish, interrupted three times near the tip.
