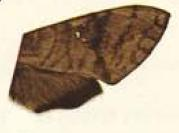

Scientific classification
- Kingdom: Animalia
- Phylum: Arthropoda
- Class: Insecta
- Order: Lepidoptera
- Family: Sphingidae
- Genus: Nephele
- Species: N. peneus

Binomial name
- Nephele peneus (Cramer, 1776)

Synonyms
- Sphinx peneus Cramer, 1776; Nephele pachyderma Karsch, 1892; Nephele peneus innotata (Rothschild & Jordan, 1903)

= Nephele peneus =

Species of moth

Nephele peneus is a moth of the family Sphingidae. It is known from forests and woodland from Senegal to East Africa, Angola and Delagoa Bay.
