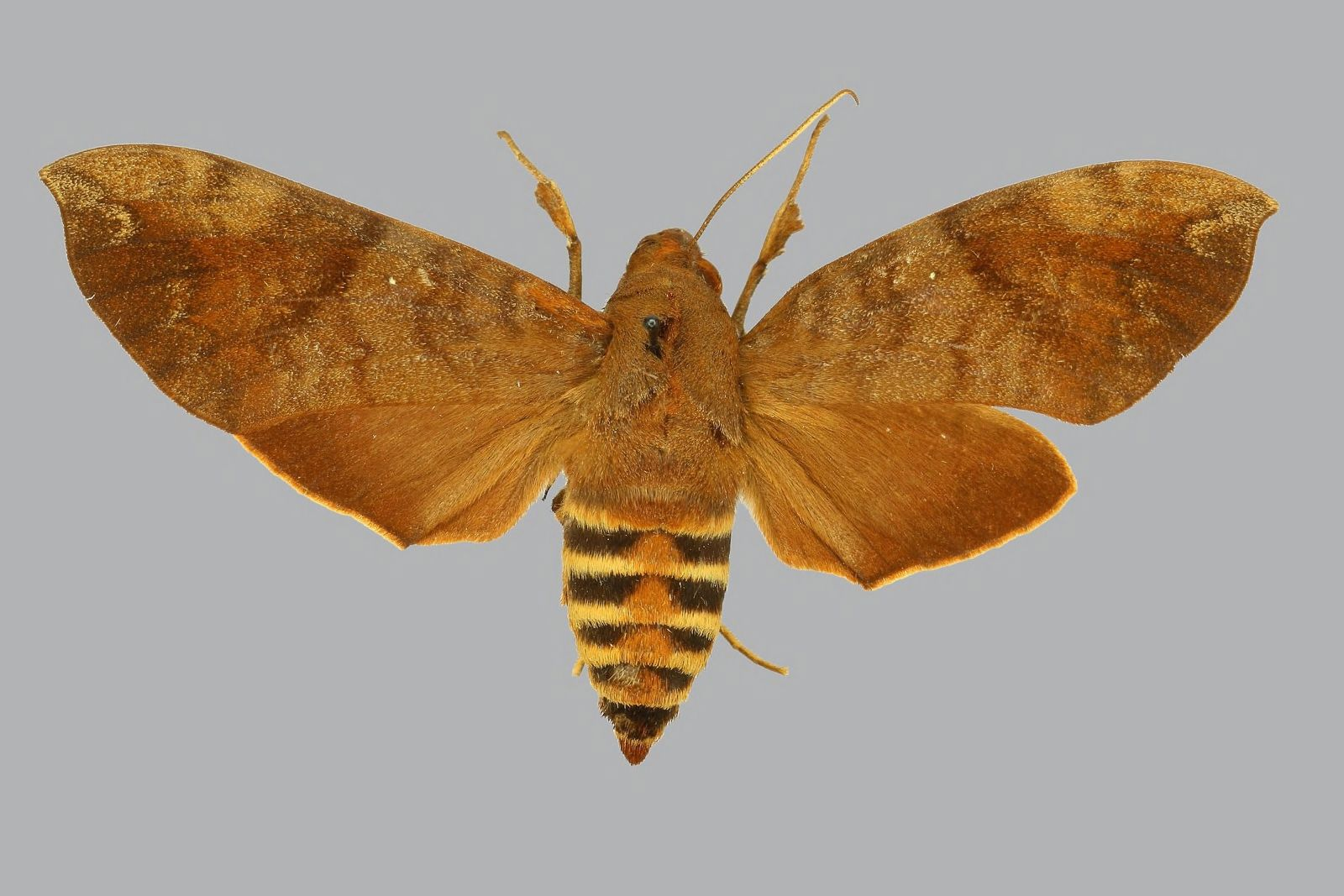
- Female

Scientific classification
- Kingdom: Animalia
- Phylum: Arthropoda
- Class: Insecta
- Order: Lepidoptera
- Family: Sphingidae
- Genus: Nephele
- Species: N. lannini

Binomial name
- Nephele lannini Jordan, 1926

= Nephele lannini =

Species of moth

Nephele lannini is a moth of the family Sphingidae. It is known from highland forests in Zimbabwe, Malawi and southern Tanzania.
