= Isophrictis corsicella =

Scientific classification
- Domain: Eukaryota
- Kingdom: Animalia
- Phylum: Arthropoda
- Class: Insecta
- Order: Lepidoptera
- Family: Gelechiidae
- Genus: Isophrictis
- Species: I. corsicella

Binomial name
- Isophrictis corsicella Amsel, 1936

Species of moth

Isophrictis corsicella is a moth of the family Gelechiidae. It was described by Hans Georg Amsel in 1936. It is found in Spain and on Corsica and Sardinia.
