= Tritonaclia quinquepunctata =

Scientific classification
- Kingdom: Animalia
- Phylum: Arthropoda
- Clade: Pancrustacea
- Class: Insecta
- Order: Lepidoptera
- Superfamily: Noctuoidea
- Family: Erebidae
- Subfamily: Arctiinae
- Genus: Tritonaclia
- Species: T. quinquepunctata

Binomial name
- Tritonaclia quinquepunctata Griveaud, 1966

Species of moth

Tritonaclia quinquepunctata is a moth in the subfamily Arctiinae. It was described by Paul Griveaud in 1966. It is found on Madagascar.
