= Isophrictis rudbeckiella =

Scientific classification
- Kingdom: Animalia
- Phylum: Arthropoda
- Class: Insecta
- Order: Lepidoptera
- Family: Gelechiidae
- Genus: Isophrictis
- Species: I. rudbeckiella

Binomial name
- Isophrictis rudbeckiella Bottimer, 1926

Synonyms
- Isophrictis similella denotata Bottimer, 1926

Species of moth

Isophrictis rudbeckiella is a moth of the family Gelechiidae. It was described by Bottimer in 1926. It is found in North America, where it has been recorded from Alabama, Iowa, Kansas, Louisiana, Mississippi, Ohio and Texas.

The wingspan is 11.5–16 mm. The forewings are covered with white-tipped dark scales, the darker color fuscous at the base, becoming black at the apex. The forewings are marked with narrow longitudinal streaks of white-tipped golden scales, one below the costa, one along the fold, and a third midway between the two, rather distinct on the basal half, the streaks beyond the middle becoming shorter, more numerous, and confused, forming a rather distinct V-shaped area of golden scales pointing toward the apex just before a strong edging of white-tipped black scales. The hindwings are dark silvery fuscous. Adults are on wing from May to August.

The larvae feed on Rudbeckia maxima. They feed on the flowerhead of the host plant and pupate within the burrow or in the upper part of the stem.
