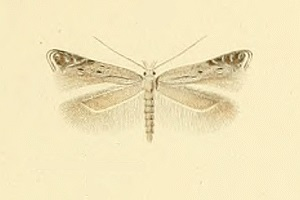

Scientific classification
- Domain: Eukaryota
- Kingdom: Animalia
- Phylum: Arthropoda
- Class: Insecta
- Order: Lepidoptera
- Family: Gelechiidae
- Genus: Isophrictis
- Species: I. invisella

Binomial name
- Isophrictis invisella (Constant, 1885)

Synonyms
- Cleodora invisella Constant, 1885

= Isophrictis invisella =

Species of moth

Isophrictis invisella is a moth of the family Gelechiidae. It was described by Alexandre Constant in 1885. It is found on Corsica, Sardinia and Sicily.

The wingspan is about 10 mm. The fore- and hindwings are grey.
