= Isophrictis sabulella =

Scientific classification
- Domain: Eukaryota
- Kingdom: Animalia
- Phylum: Arthropoda
- Class: Insecta
- Order: Lepidoptera
- Family: Gelechiidae
- Genus: Isophrictis
- Species: I. sabulella

Binomial name
- Isophrictis sabulella (Walsingham, 1888)

Synonyms
- Cleodora sabulella Walsingham, 1888

Species of moth

Isophrictis sabulella is a moth of the family Gelechiidae. It was described by Thomas de Grey, 6th Baron Walsingham, in 1888. It is found in North America, where it has been recorded from California.

The wingspan is 14–15.5 mm. The forewings are fawn-colour with a slight brownish tinge towards the apex, where there is some appearance of pale speckling owing to the tips of the scales about the cilia and apical margin being of a lighter hue. The hindwings are fawn colour, with a greyish tinge.
