= Isophrictis pallidastrigella =

Scientific classification
- Kingdom: Animalia
- Phylum: Arthropoda
- Clade: Pancrustacea
- Class: Insecta
- Order: Lepidoptera
- Family: Gelechiidae
- Genus: Isophrictis
- Species: I. pallidastrigella

Binomial name
- Isophrictis pallidastrigella (Chambers, 1874)

Synonyms
- Cleodora pallidastrigella Chambers, 1874

Species of moth

Isophrictis pallidastrigella is a moth of the family Gelechiidae. It was described by Vactor Tousey Chambers in 1874. It is found in North America, where it has been recorded from Texas and California.

The forewings are pale orange, but paler, nearly white along the dorsal margin, and on the extreme costa beyond the middle. There is a narrow, indistinct, whitish line along the fold, ending at a small brown spot and there is also an oblique, narrow, whitish streak along the base of the costal cilia, continuous with the white of the extreme costa, and there is a short one along the base of the dorsal cilia. A minute brownish spot is surrounded by a pale ring at the end of the disc, and an oblique brownish streak in the cilia at the apex. The brown spots are all indistinct.
