= Tritonaclia kefersteinii =

Scientific classification
- Kingdom: Animalia
- Phylum: Arthropoda
- Clade: Pancrustacea
- Class: Insecta
- Order: Lepidoptera
- Superfamily: Noctuoidea
- Family: Erebidae
- Subfamily: Arctiinae
- Genus: Tritonaclia
- Species: T. kefersteinii

Binomial name
- Tritonaclia kefersteinii (Butler, 1882)

Synonyms
- Hydrusa kefersteinii Butler, 1882

Species of moth

Tritonaclia kefersteinii is a moth in the subfamily Arctiinae. It was described by Arthur Gardiner Butler in 1882. It is found in Madagascar.
