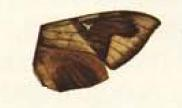

Scientific classification
- Kingdom: Animalia
- Phylum: Arthropoda
- Class: Insecta
- Order: Lepidoptera
- Family: Sphingidae
- Genus: Nephele
- Species: N. vau

Binomial name
- Nephele vau (Walker, 1856)

Synonyms
- Zonilia vau Walker, 1856; Zonilia raffrayi Oberthür, 1878; Zonilia schimperi H. Lucas, 1857

= Nephele vau =

Species of moth

Nephele vau is a moth of the family Sphingidae first described by Francis Walker in 1856. It is common throughout most of Africa south of the Sahara, but rarer in southern Africa.
