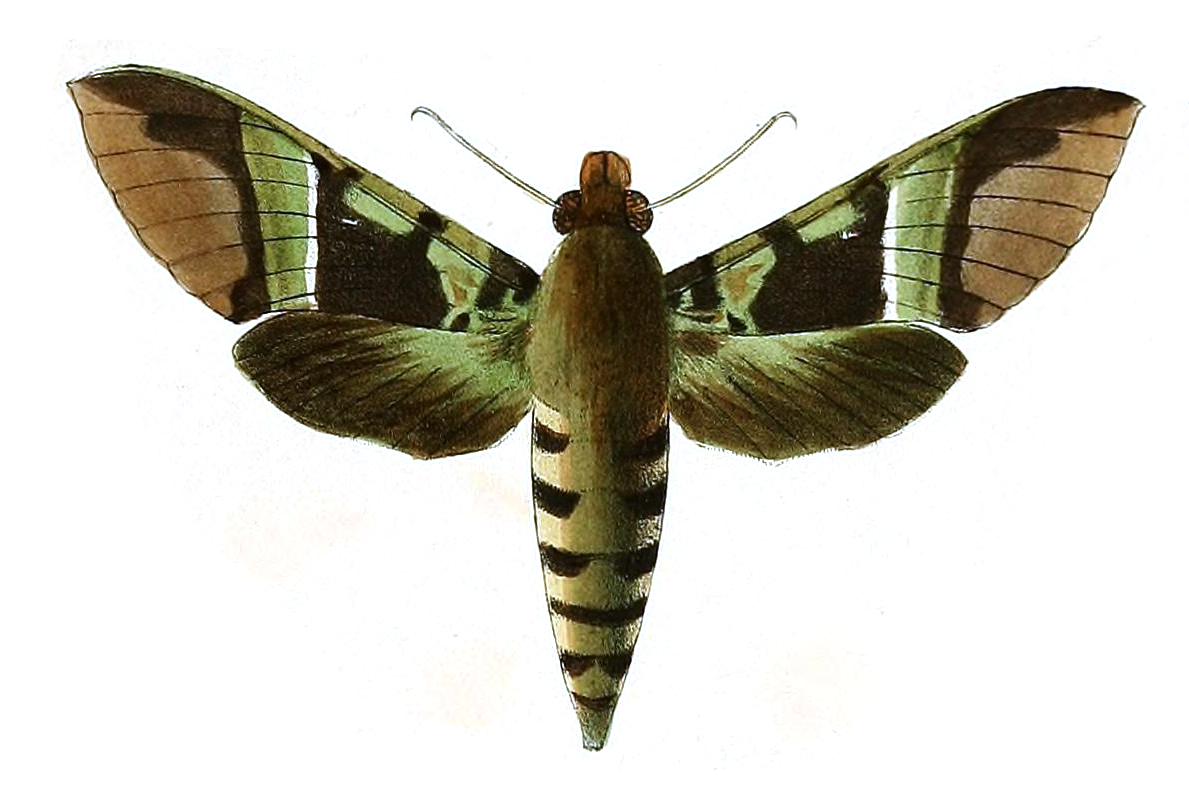

Scientific classification
- Kingdom: Animalia
- Phylum: Arthropoda
- Class: Insecta
- Order: Lepidoptera
- Family: Sphingidae
- Genus: Nephele
- Species: N. rosae

Binomial name
- Nephele rosae Butler, 1875

Synonyms
- Nephele rosae destigmata Strand, 1912

= Nephele rosae =

Species of moth

Nephele rosae is a moth in the family Sphingidae. It is endemic to Africa.

== Subspecies ==
- Nephele rosae rosae (forest and woodland from Sierra Leone to Angola and Uganda)
- Nephele rosae illustris Jordan, 1920 (South Africa and Mozambique to Zimbabwe, Zambia, Malawi, Tanzania and the coast of Kenya)
