= Isophrictis actiella =

Scientific classification
- Domain: Eukaryota
- Kingdom: Animalia
- Phylum: Arthropoda
- Class: Insecta
- Order: Lepidoptera
- Family: Gelechiidae
- Genus: Isophrictis
- Species: I. actiella

Binomial name
- Isophrictis actiella Barnes & Busck, 1920

Species of moth

Isophrictis actiella is a moth of the family Gelechiidae, described by William Barnes and August Busck in 1920. It is found in North America, where it has been recorded from California.

The wingspan is 10–11 mm. The forewings are dark brownish fuscous with a greenish sheen and a broad longitudinal spindle-shaped white streak on the middle of the wing from the base to the end of the cell. There is an outwardly oblique white costal streak before the cilia, meeting a similar opposite dorsal streak in a sharp angle. Three white costal dashes and five nearly confluent dorsal pencils are found beyond these first streaks and there is a deep black basal line at the base of the apical cilia. The hindwings are silvery fuscous.
