= Isophrictis pennella =

Scientific classification
- Kingdom: Animalia
- Phylum: Arthropoda
- Clade: Pancrustacea
- Class: Insecta
- Order: Lepidoptera
- Family: Gelechiidae
- Genus: Isophrictis
- Species: I. pennella

Binomial name
- Isophrictis pennella (Busck, 1907)

Synonyms
- Paltodora pennella Busck, 1907

Species of moth

Isophrictis pennella is a moth of the family Gelechiidae. It was described by August Busck in 1907. It is found in North America, where it has been recorded from Arizona.

The wingspan is about 15 mm. The forewings are light ochreous, with the extreme costal edge and a narrow longitudinal streak on the fold white. From apical fifth of costa runs a faint oblique white streak across the wing to the termen and on the middle of the fold is a short longitudinal black streak, above this in the cell is a larger longitudinal streak, and at the end of the cell is a third very short black streak or dot. A few single black scales are sprinkled over the apical half of the wing along costal and dorsal edge. The hindwings are light ochreous fuscous.
