= Tritonaclia =

Scientific classification
- Kingdom: Animalia
- Phylum: Arthropoda
- Class: Insecta
- Order: Lepidoptera
- Superfamily: Noctuoidea
- Family: Erebidae
- Subfamily: Arctiinae
- Tribe: Syntomini
- Genus: Tritonaclia; Hampson, 1898

Genus of moths

Tritonaclia is a genus of moths in the subfamily Arctiinae.

== Species ==
- Tritonaclia inauramacula Griveaud, 1964
- Tritonaclia kefersteini Butler, 1882
- Tritonaclia melania Oberthür
- Tritonaclia quinquepunctata Griveaud, 1966
- Tritonaclia stephania Oberthür
- Tritonaclia tollini Kerfenst., 1870

== Former species ==
- Tritonaclia erubescens Hampson, 1901
