= Isophrictis microlina =

Scientific classification
- Kingdom: Animalia
- Phylum: Arthropoda
- Class: Insecta
- Order: Lepidoptera
- Family: Gelechiidae
- Genus: Isophrictis
- Species: I. microlina

Binomial name
- Isophrictis microlina Meyrick, 1935

Species of moth

Isophrictis microlina is a moth of the family Gelechiidae. It was described by Edward Meyrick in 1935. It is found in Spain.
