= Isophrictis canicostella =

Scientific classification
- Kingdom: Animalia
- Phylum: Arthropoda
- Class: Insecta
- Order: Lepidoptera
- Family: Gelechiidae
- Genus: Isophrictis
- Species: I. canicostella

Binomial name
- Isophrictis canicostella (Walsingham, 1888)

Synonyms
- Cleodora canicostella Walsingham, 1888

Species of moth

Isophrictis canicostella is a moth of the family Gelechiidae. It was described by Thomas de Grey, 6th Baron Walsingham, in 1888. It is found in North America, where it has been recorded from California and Colorado.

The wingspan is about 12 mm. The forewings are brown, with green or rosy iridescent tips to the scales, especially on the outer half of the wing, visible only in a strong light. The middle third of the costa is narrowly white, the white streak widening outwardly. Beyond it, is an outwardly oblique costal streak which crosses the wing before the apex, followed by an inwardly oblique small white costal streak and some fuscous dots in the cilia. Along the apical margin runs a white line in the cilia between two narrower fuscous lines. There are a few fuscous scales at the anal angle and above them a short longitudinal white streak. A short fuscous streak beyond the middle of the fold almost reaches the commencement of a more conspicuous discal streak of the same colour immediately above it, both margined by a few inconspicuous whitish scales. The hindwings are brown, with a purplish tinge.
