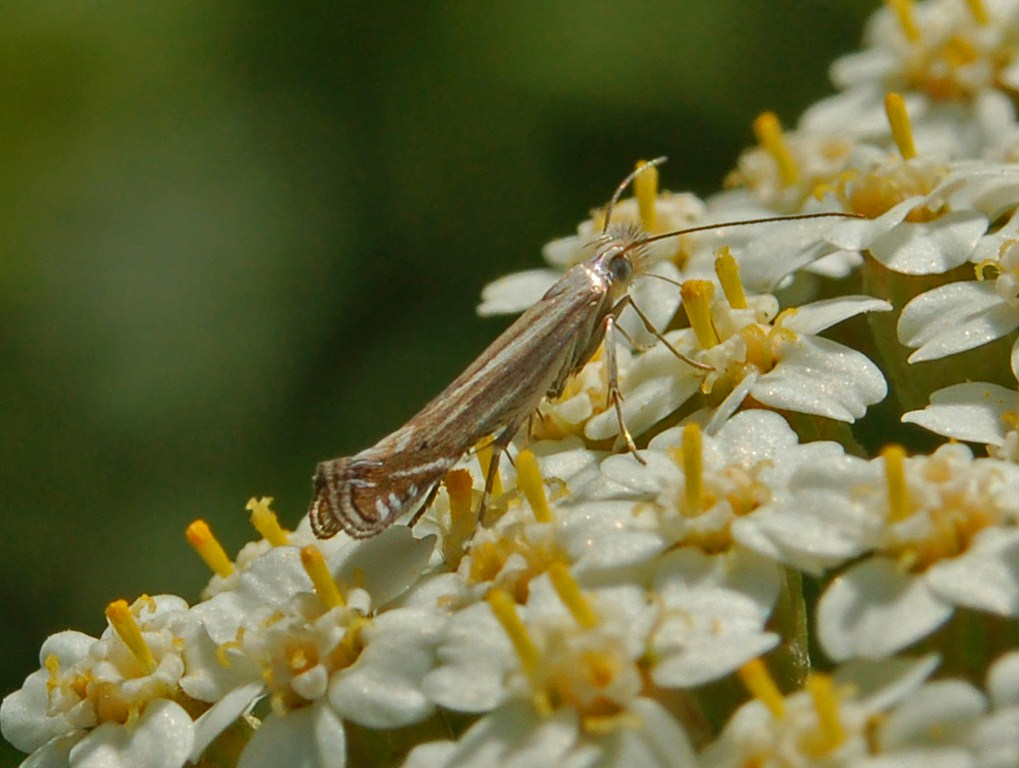
- Isophrictis striatella

Scientific classification
- Domain: Eukaryota
- Kingdom: Animalia
- Phylum: Arthropoda
- Class: Insecta
- Order: Lepidoptera
- Family: Gelechiidae
- Subfamily: Anomologinae
- Tribe: Isophrictini
- Genus: Isophrictis; Meyrick, 1917

= Isophrictis =

Genus of moths

Isophrictis is a genus of moths in the family Gelechiidae.

== Species ==
- Isophrictis actiella Barnes & Busck, 1920
- Isophrictis actinopa Meyrick, 1929
- Isophrictis anteliella (Busck, 1903)
- Isophrictis anthemidella (Wocke, 1871)
- Isophrictis canicostella (Walsingham, 1888)
- Isophrictis cerdanica Nel, 1995
- Isophrictis cilialineella (Chambers, 1874)
- Isophrictis constantina (Baker, 1888)
- Isophrictis corsicella Amsel, 1936
- Isophrictis dietziella (Busck, 1903)
- Isophrictis impugnata Gozmany, 1957
- Isophrictis invisella (Constant, 1885)
- Isophrictis kefersteiniellus (Zeller, 1850)
- Isophrictis lineatellus (Zeller, 1850)
- Isophrictis magnella (Busck, 1903)
- Isophrictis meridionella (Herrich-Schäffer, 1854)
- Isophrictis microlina Meyrick, 1935
- Isophrictis modesta (Walsingham, 1888)
- Isophrictis occidentalis Braun, 1925
- Isophrictis oudianella (Lucas, 1942)
- Isophrictis pallidastrigella (Chambers, 1874)
- Isophrictis pallidella (Chambers, 1874)
- Isophrictis pennella (Busck, 1907)
- Isophrictis robinella (Chretien, 1907)
- Isophrictis rudbeckiella Bottimer, 1926
- Isophrictis sabulella (Walsingham, 1888)
- Isophrictis similiella (Chambers, 1872)
- Isophrictis striatella (Denis & Schiffermuller, 1775)
- Isophrictis tophella (Walsingham, 1888)
- Isophrictis trimaculella (Chambers, 1874)
