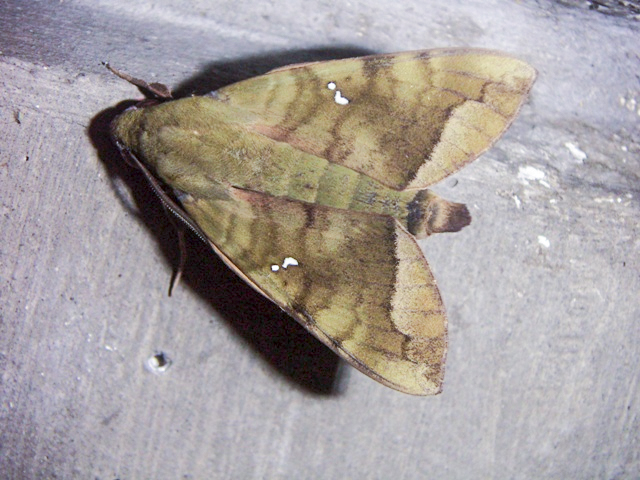

Scientific classification
- Kingdom: Animalia
- Phylum: Arthropoda
- Class: Insecta
- Order: Lepidoptera
- Family: Sphingidae
- Genus: Nephele
- Species: N. hespera

Binomial name
- Nephele hespera (Fabricius, 1775)

Synonyms
- Sphinx hespera Fabricius, 1775; Sphinx didyma Fabricius, 1775; Sphinx quaterna Esper, 1794; Sphinx morpheus Cramer, 1777; Sphinx chiron Cramer, 1777; Perigonia obliterans Walker, 1865

= Nephele hespera =

Crepuscular hawkmoth

Species of moth

Nephele hespera, the crepuscular hawkmoth, is a sphingid moth described by Johan Christian Fabricius in 1775.

== Distribution ==
It is found in the tropical and subtropical forests of Sri Lanka, India, Nepal, Myanmar, southern China, Thailand, Vietnam, Malaysia and Indonesia.

== Description ==
Head, thorax and abdomen olive brown or green. Abdomen is with lateral black segmental bands. Forewings are olive brown or green, with six faint waved lines and an angled submarginal line. The space between it and outer margin is paler. At the end of the cell, there are two conspicuous silvery-white spots, which may be reduced to a speck or be altogether obsolete. Hindwings are reddish brown and cilia are ochreous. Ventral side is paler, each wing with two transverse lines. Larva is greenish with a pale stripe from 7th to 11th somites.

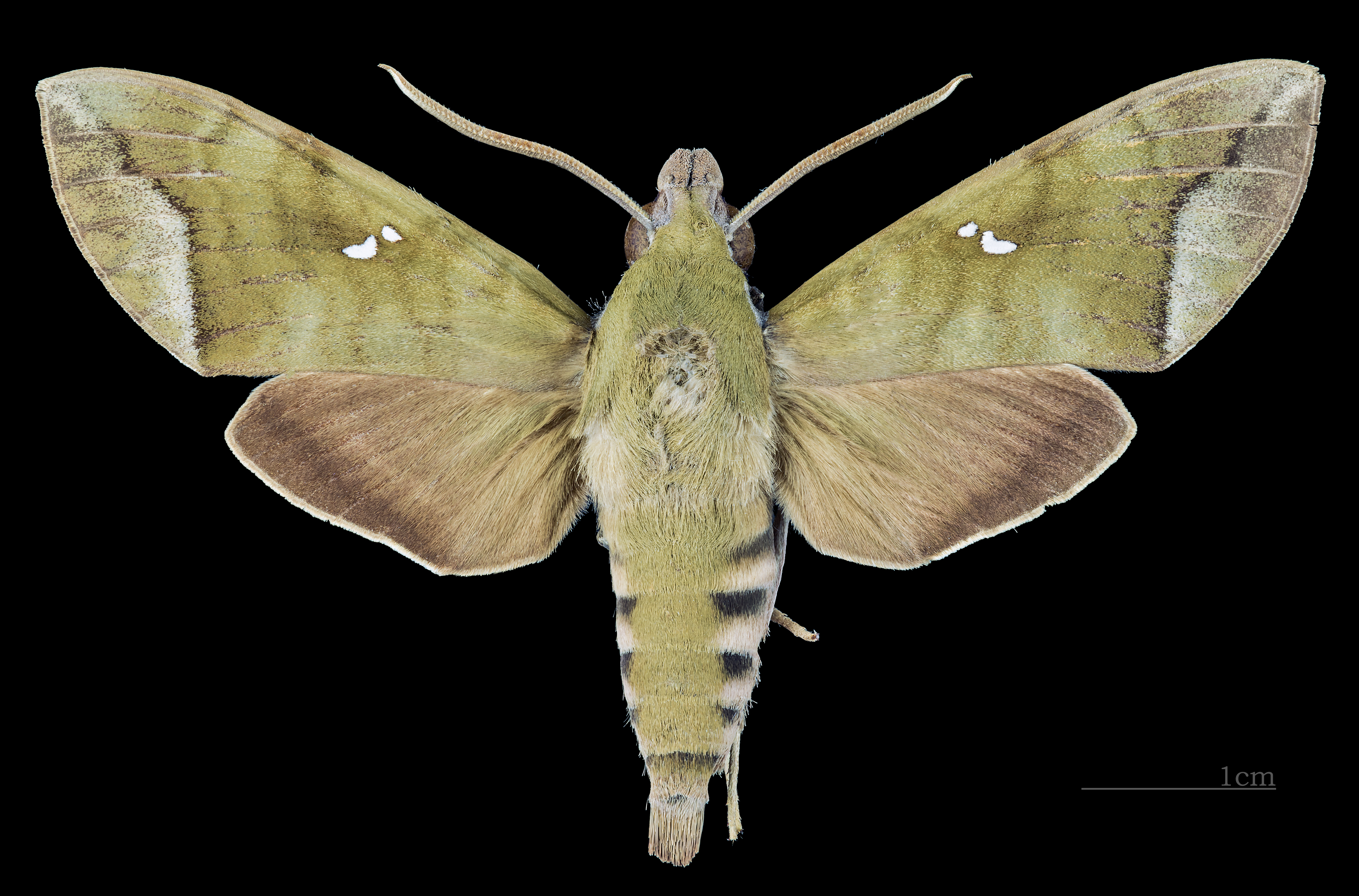
Male dorsal view

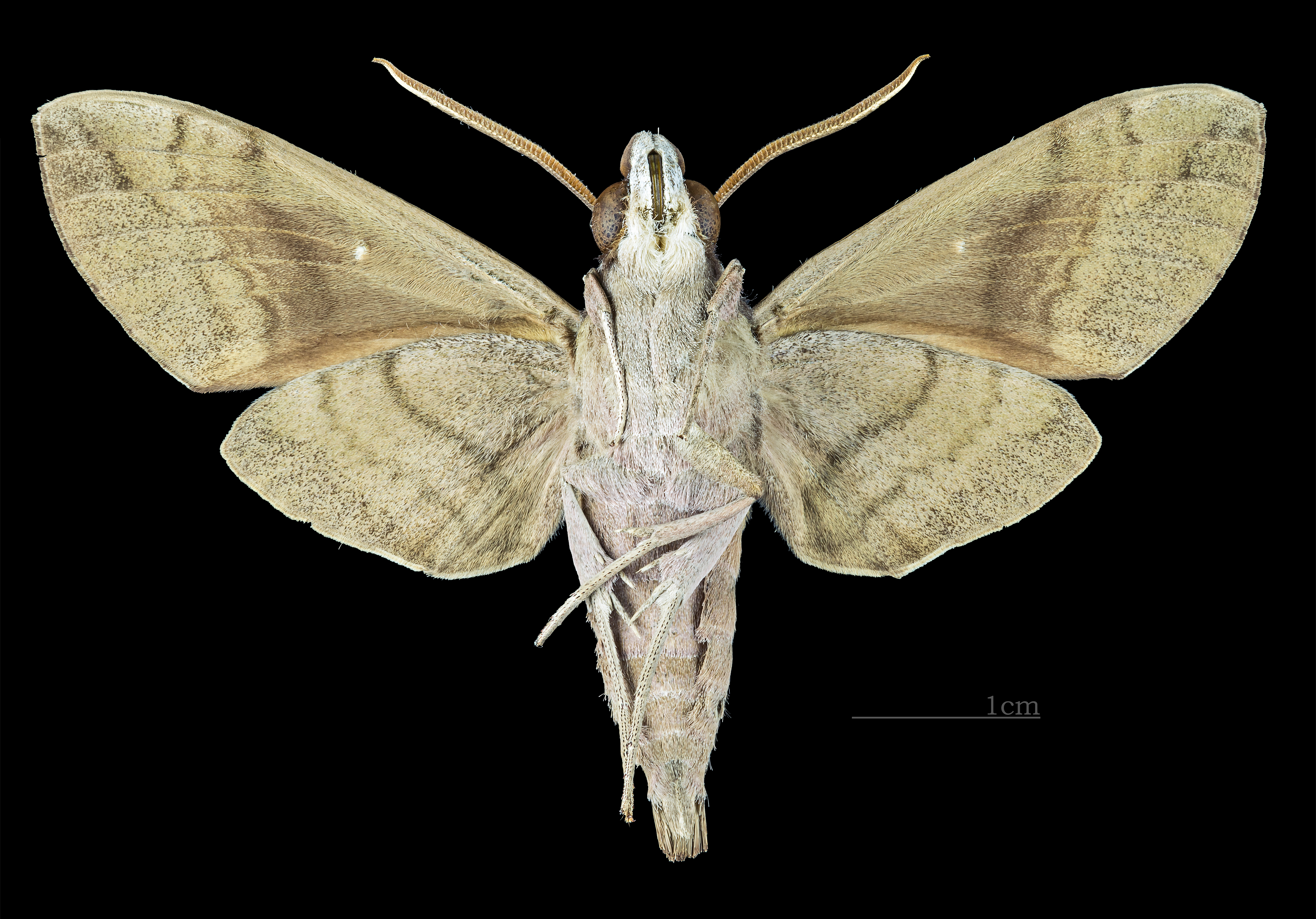
Male ventral view

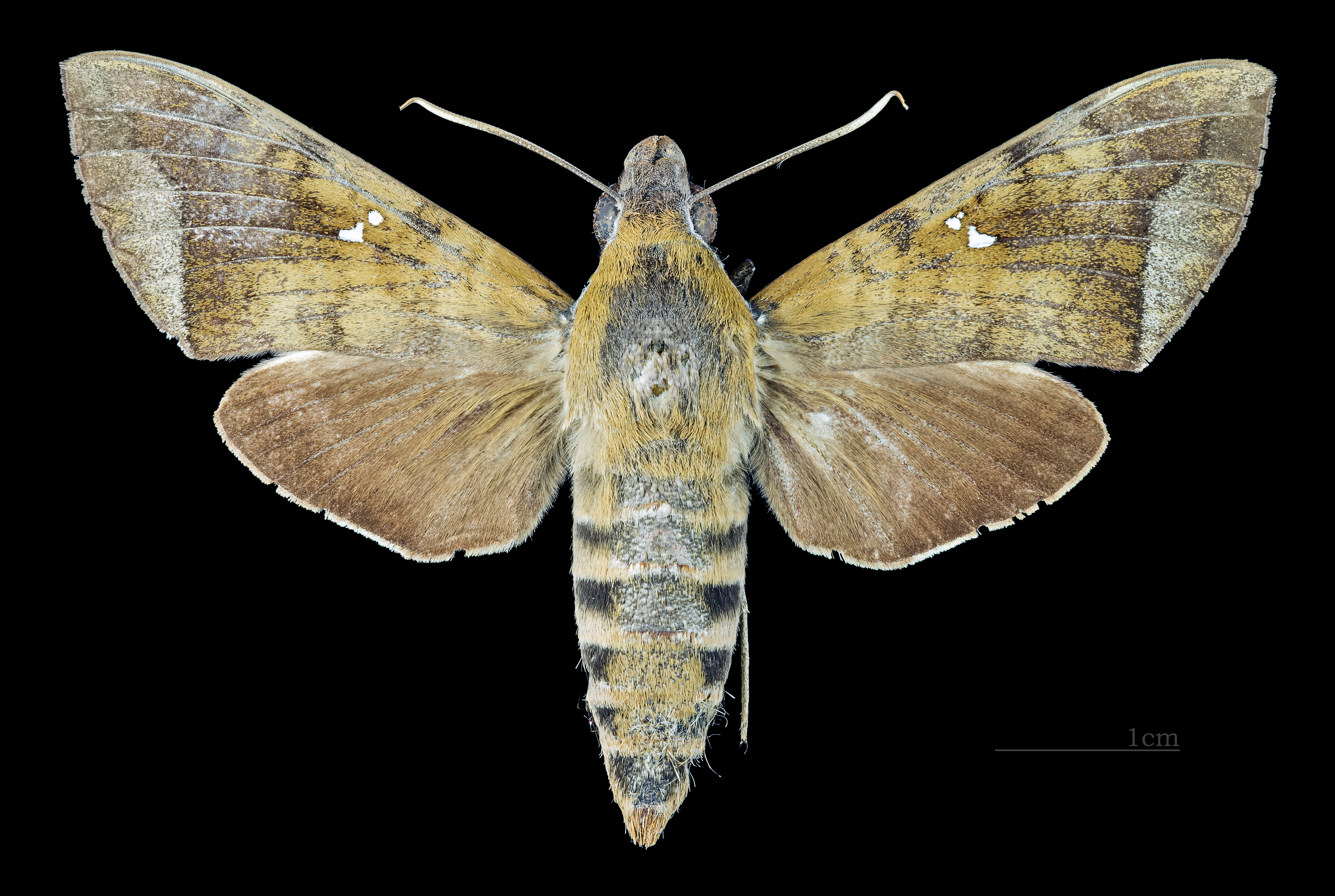
Female dorsal view

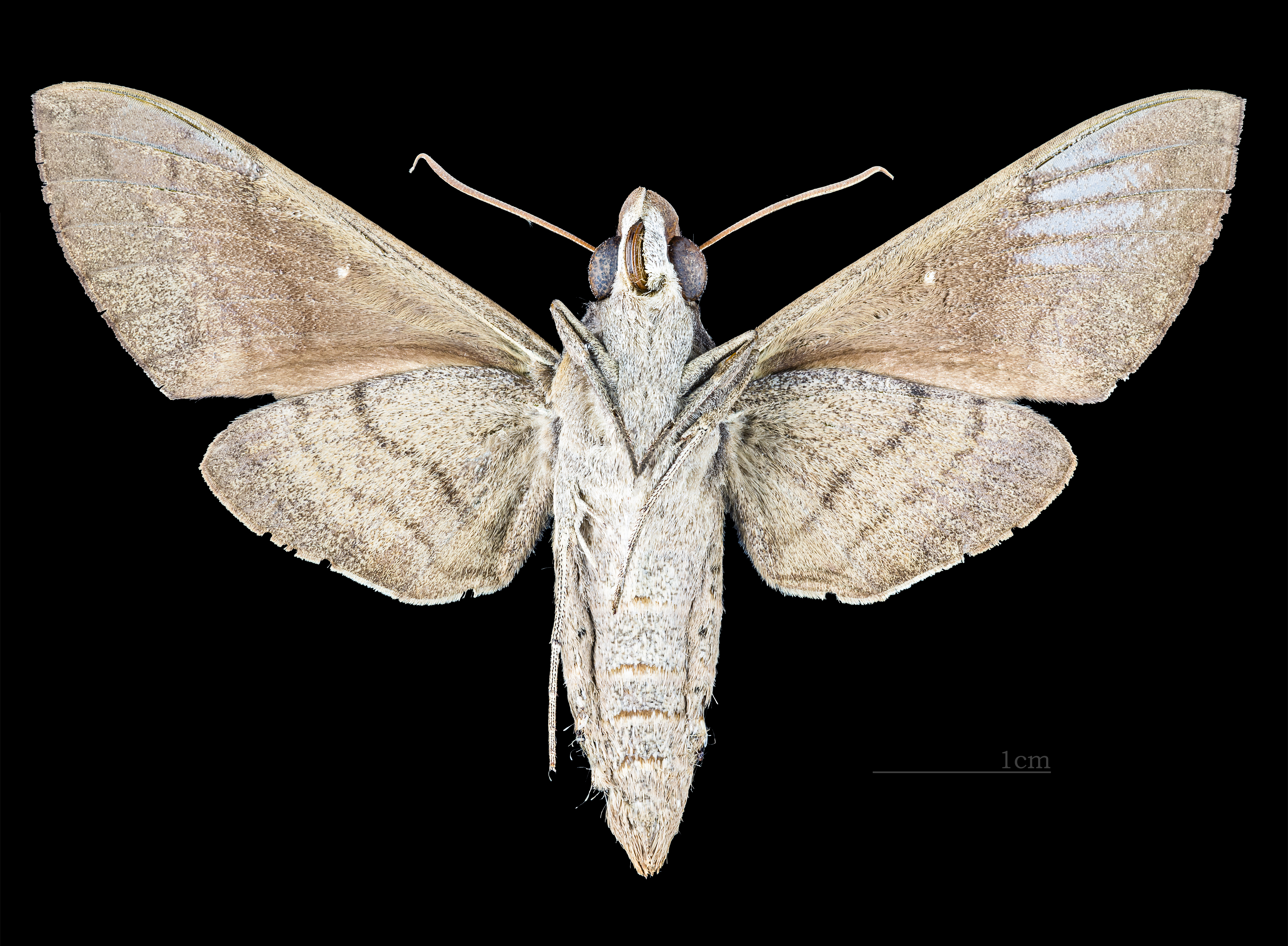
Female ventral view

== Biology ==
The larvae feed on Carissa congesta. Pupa is bone yellow in color. The moth rests with the wings held horizontal and the tip of the abdomen slightly upturned.
