= Isophrictis lineatellus =

Scientific classification
- Kingdom: Animalia
- Phylum: Arthropoda
- Clade: Pancrustacea
- Class: Insecta
- Order: Lepidoptera
- Family: Gelechiidae
- Genus: Isophrictis
- Species: I. lineatellus

Binomial name
- Isophrictis lineatellus (Zeller, 1850)

Synonyms
- Ypsolophus lineatellus Zeller, 1850; Paltodora latistriella Turati, 1924

Species of moth

Isophrictis lineatellus is a moth of the family Gelechiidae. It was described by Philipp Christoph Zeller in 1850. It is found in Asia Minor, North Africa and Spain, Portugal, France, Corsica, Sardinia, Sicily, Italy and Greece.
