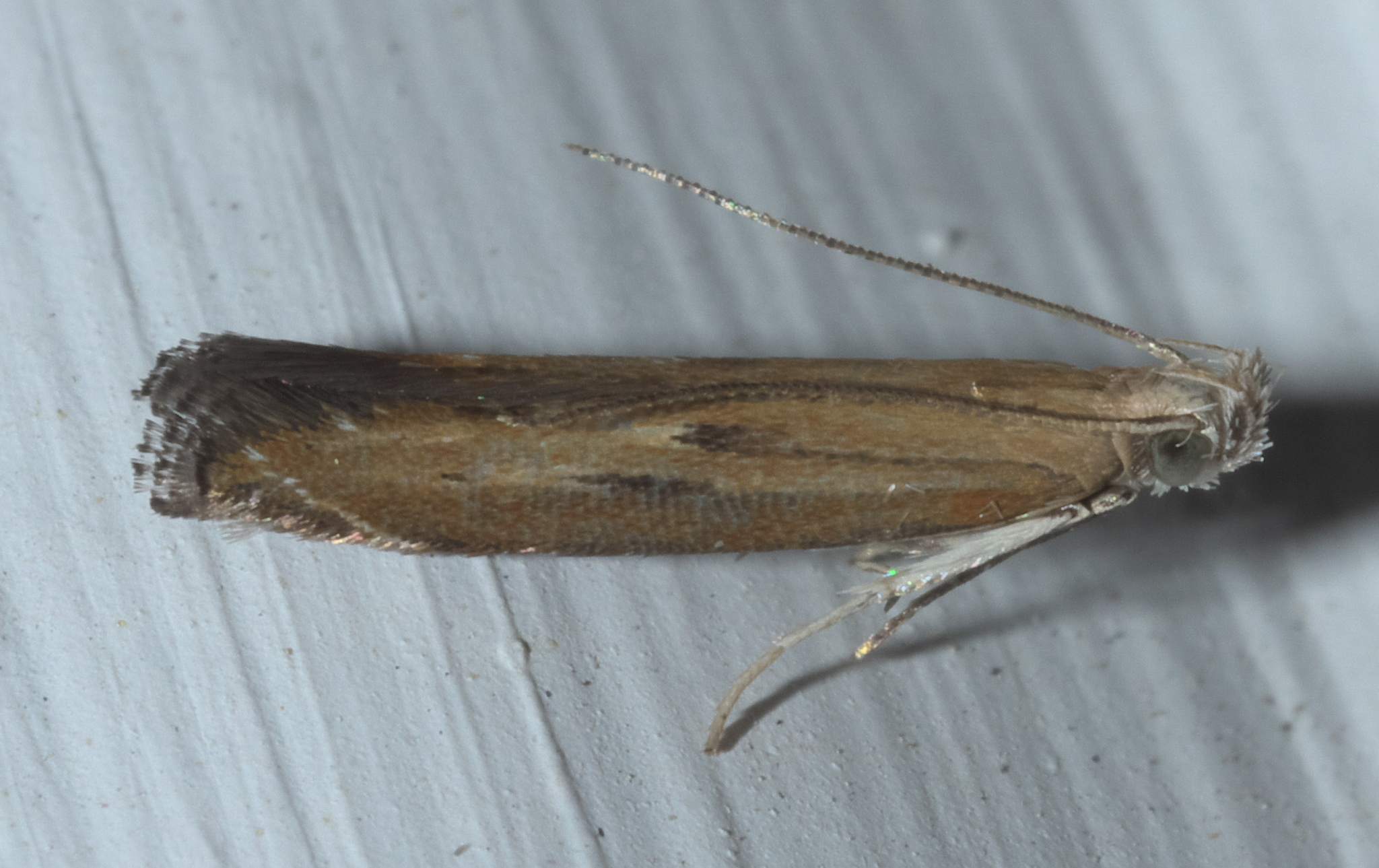
- Isophrictis anteliella, Oklahoma

Scientific classification
- Domain: Eukaryota
- Kingdom: Animalia
- Phylum: Arthropoda
- Class: Insecta
- Order: Lepidoptera
- Family: Gelechiidae
- Genus: Isophrictis
- Species: I. anteliella

Binomial name
- Isophrictis anteliella (Busck, 1903)

Synonyms
- Paltodora anteliella Busck, 1903

= Isophrictis anteliella =

Species of moth

Isophrictis anteliella is a moth of the family Gelechiidae. It was described by August Busck in 1903. It is found in North America, where it has been recorded from Illinois, Ohio, New Jersey and Texas.

The wingspan is 12-12.5 mm. The forewings are darker reddish brown with one short longitudinal streak on the fold and one similar one in the middle of the wing. Both these are black. The second discal stigma is circular and black. A thin white line is found from the costal apical one-fourth very obliquely outward across the wing to the termen. The hindwings are dark gray.
