= Isophrictis tophella =

Scientific classification
- Domain: Eukaryota
- Kingdom: Animalia
- Phylum: Arthropoda
- Class: Insecta
- Order: Lepidoptera
- Family: Gelechiidae
- Genus: Isophrictis
- Species: I. tophella

Binomial name
- Isophrictis tophella (Walsingham, 1888)

Synonyms
- Cleodora tophella Walsingham, 1888

Species of moth

Isophrictis tophella is a moth of the family Gelechiidae. It was described by Thomas de Grey, 6th Baron Walsingham, in 1888. It is found in North America, where it has been recorded from California, Arizona and New Mexico.

The wingspan is about 23 mm. The forewings are dull ashy brown, with a considerable sprinkling of brighter (more reddish brown) scales. The tips of the scales about the apical margin and cilia are paler and give a speckled appearance to the end of the wing. The hindwings are brownish cinereous.
