= Tritonaclia tollini =

Scientific classification
- Kingdom: Animalia
- Phylum: Arthropoda
- Clade: Pancrustacea
- Class: Insecta
- Order: Lepidoptera
- Superfamily: Noctuoidea
- Family: Erebidae
- Subfamily: Arctiinae
- Genus: Tritonaclia
- Species: T. tollini

Binomial name
- Tritonaclia tollini (Keferstein, 1870)

Synonyms
- Glaucopis tollinii Keferstein, 1870

Species of moth

Tritonaclia tollini is a moth in the subfamily Arctiinae. It was described by Georg Adolf Keferstein in 1870. It is found in Madagascar.
