= Isophrictis robinella =

Scientific classification
- Domain: Eukaryota
- Kingdom: Animalia
- Phylum: Arthropoda
- Class: Insecta
- Order: Lepidoptera
- Family: Gelechiidae
- Genus: Isophrictis
- Species: I. robinella

Binomial name
- Isophrictis robinella (Chrétien, 1907)

Synonyms
- Paltodora robinella Chrétien, 1907

Species of moth

Isophrictis robinella is a moth of the family Gelechiidae. It was described by Pierre Chrétien in 1907. It is found in southern France.

The wingspan is about 15 mm.

== Etymology ==
The species is named for the type locality, the Canal de la Robine in the Languedoc-Roussillon region of France.
