= Isophrictis pallidella =

Scientific classification
- Kingdom: Animalia
- Phylum: Arthropoda
- Clade: Pancrustacea
- Class: Insecta
- Order: Lepidoptera
- Family: Gelechiidae
- Genus: Isophrictis
- Species: I. pallidella

Binomial name
- Isophrictis pallidella (Chambers, 1874)

Synonyms
- Cleodora pallidella Chambers, 1874

Species of moth

Isophrictis pallidella is a moth of the family Gelechiidae. It was described by Vactor Tousey Chambers in 1874. It is found in North America, where it has been recorded from Colorado and Texas.

Adults appear very pale gray, almost white, but under the lens it appears pale ocherous gray, with minute and indistinct pale fuscous specks.
