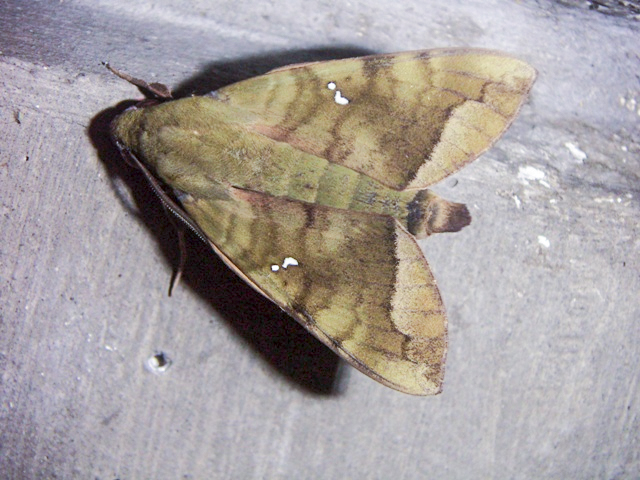
- Nephele hespera

Scientific classification
- Domain: Eukaryota
- Kingdom: Animalia
- Phylum: Arthropoda
- Class: Insecta
- Order: Lepidoptera
- Family: Sphingidae
- Tribe: Macroglossini
- Subtribe: Macroglossina
- Genus: Nephele; Hübner, 1819

Type species
- Sphinx morpheus Cramer, 1777

Synonyms
- Orneus Hübner, 1824; Zonilia Walker, 1856

= Nephele (moth) =

Genus of moths

Nephele is an Old World genus of moths in the family Sphingidae.

== Species ==
- Nephele accentifera (Palisot de Beauvois, 1821)
- Nephele aequivalens (Walker, 1856)
- Nephele argentifera (Walker, 1856)
- Nephele bipartita Butler, 1878
- Nephele comma Hopffer, 1857
- Nephele comoroana Clark, 1923
- Nephele densoi (Keferstein, 1870)
- Nephele discifera Karsch, 1891
- Nephele funebris (Fabricius, 1793)
- Nephele hespera (Fabricius, 1775)
- Nephele joiceyi Clark, 1923
- Nephele lannini Jordan, 1926
- Nephele leighi Joicey & Talbot, 1921
- Nephele maculosa Rothschild & Jordan, 1903
- Nephele monostigma Clark, 1925
- Nephele oenopion (Hübner, 1824)
- Nephele peneus (Cramer, 1776)
- Nephele rectangulata Rothschild, 1895
- Nephele rosae Butler, 1875
- Nephele subvaria (Walker, 1856)
- Nephele vau (Walker, 1856)
- Nephele xylina Rothschild & Jordan, 1910
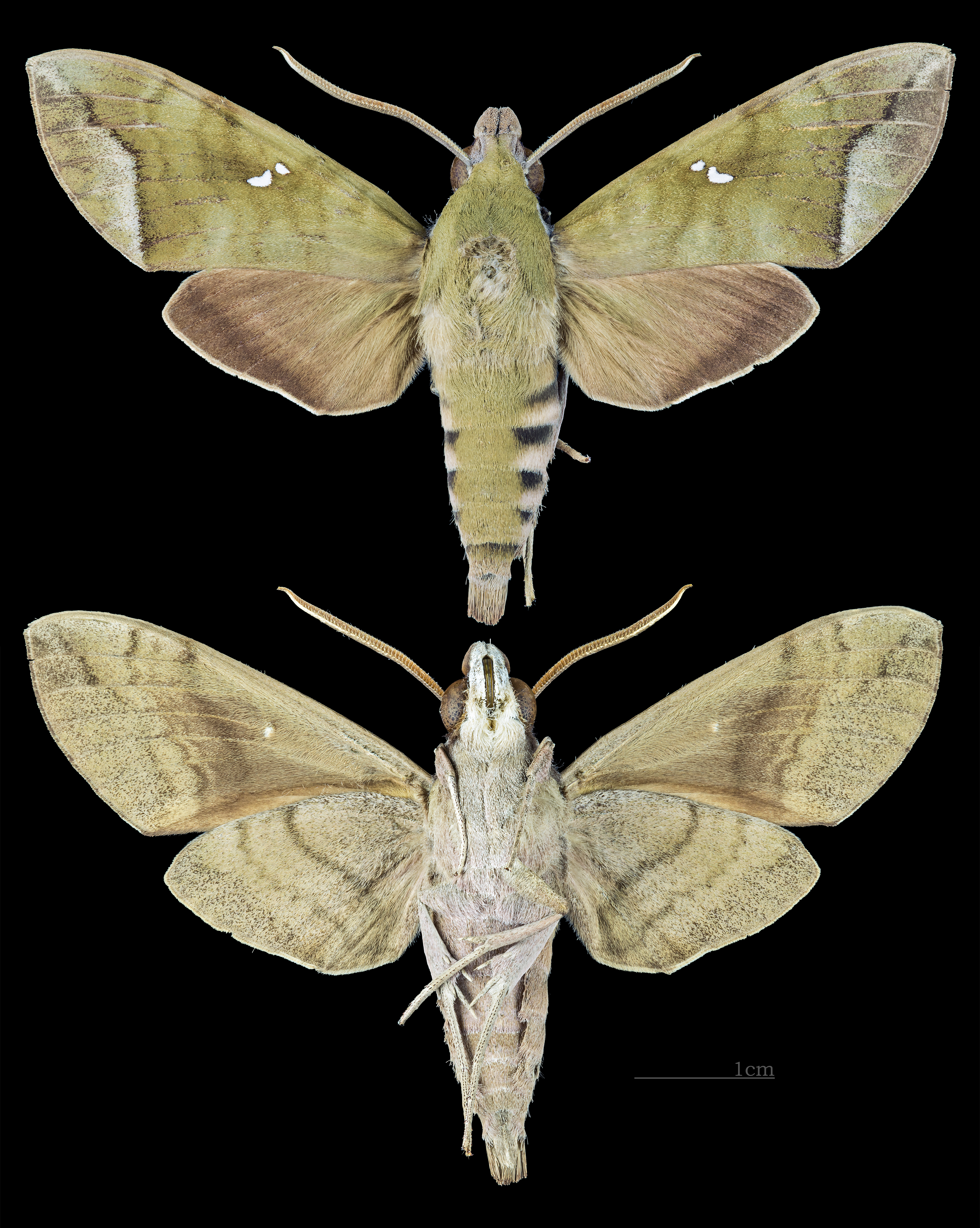
Nephele hespera

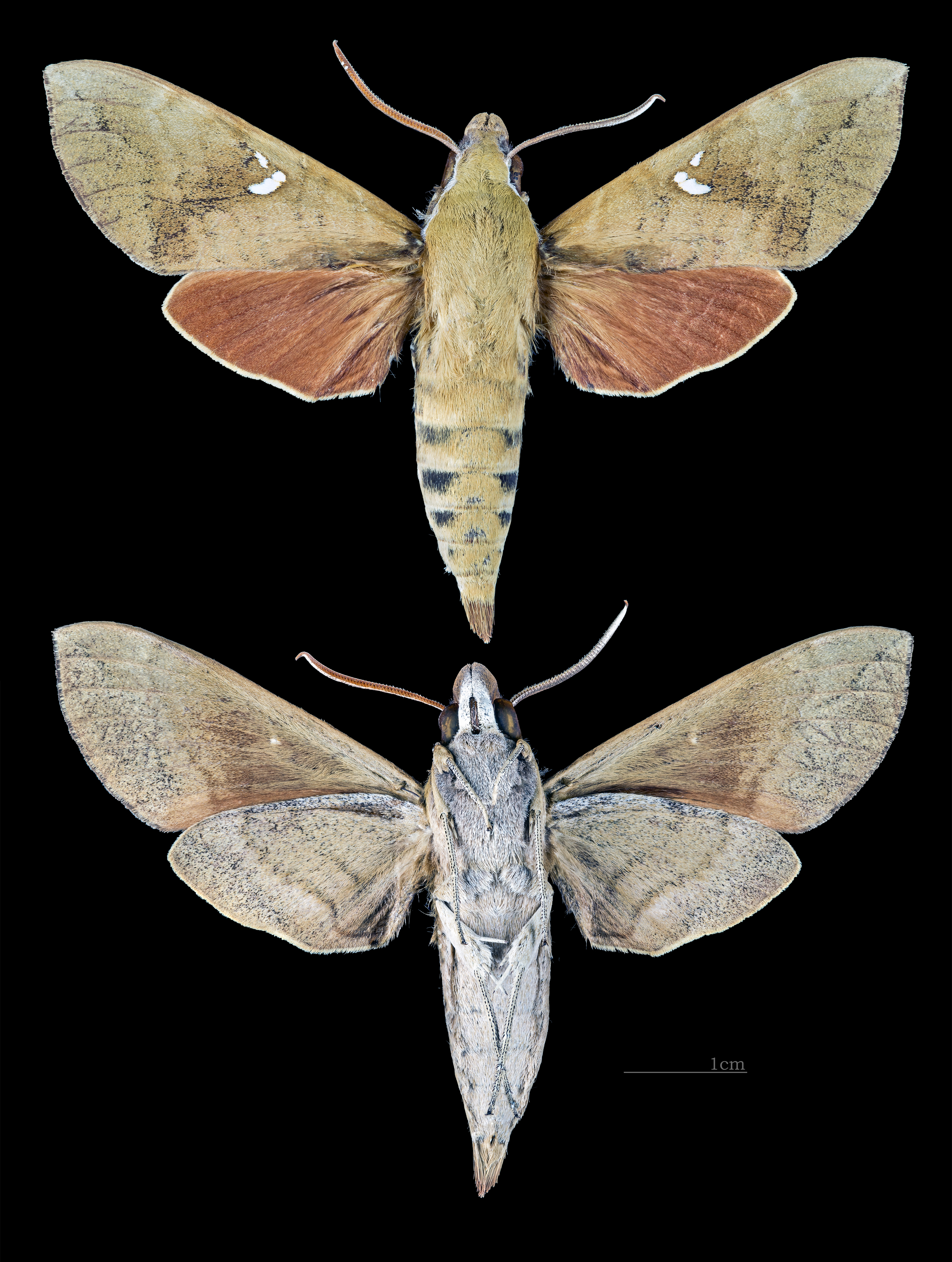
Nephele subvaria
