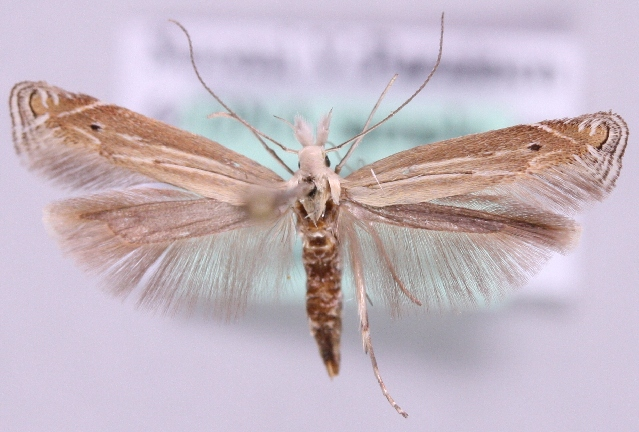

Scientific classification
- Kingdom: Animalia
- Phylum: Arthropoda
- Clade: Pancrustacea
- Class: Insecta
- Order: Lepidoptera
- Family: Gelechiidae
- Genus: Isophrictis
- Species: I. anthemidella

Binomial name
- Isophrictis anthemidella (Wocke, 1871)

Synonyms
- Cleodora anthemidella Wocke, 1871; Paltodora magna Amsel, 1935

= Isophrictis anthemidella =

Species of moth

Isophrictis anthemidella is a moth of the family Gelechiidae. It is found from most of Europe to the Caucasus and Central Asia.

The wingspan is 11–13 mm. Adults are on wing from May to August in one generation per year.

The larvae feed on Pyrethrum corymbosom, Achillea ptarmica and Anthemis tinctoria. On calcareous slopes, the larvae have also been found feeding on the flowers of Anthemis trotzkiana.
