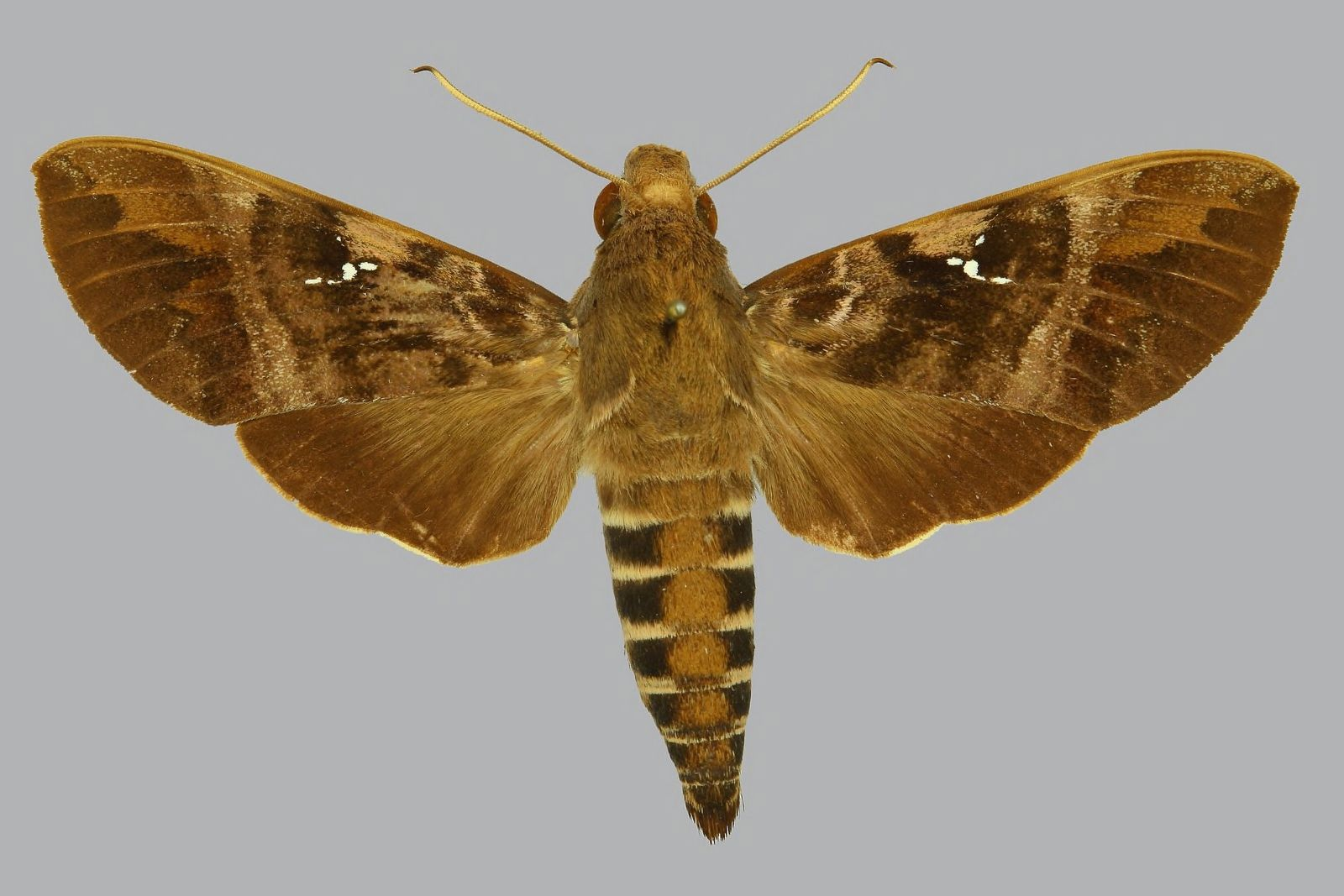

Scientific classification
- Kingdom: Animalia
- Phylum: Arthropoda
- Class: Insecta
- Order: Lepidoptera
- Family: Sphingidae
- Genus: Nephele
- Species: N. comoroana

Binomial name
- Nephele comoroana Clark, 1923

= Nephele comoroana =

Species of moth

Nephele comoroana is a moth of the family Sphingidae. It is known from the Comoro Islands.
