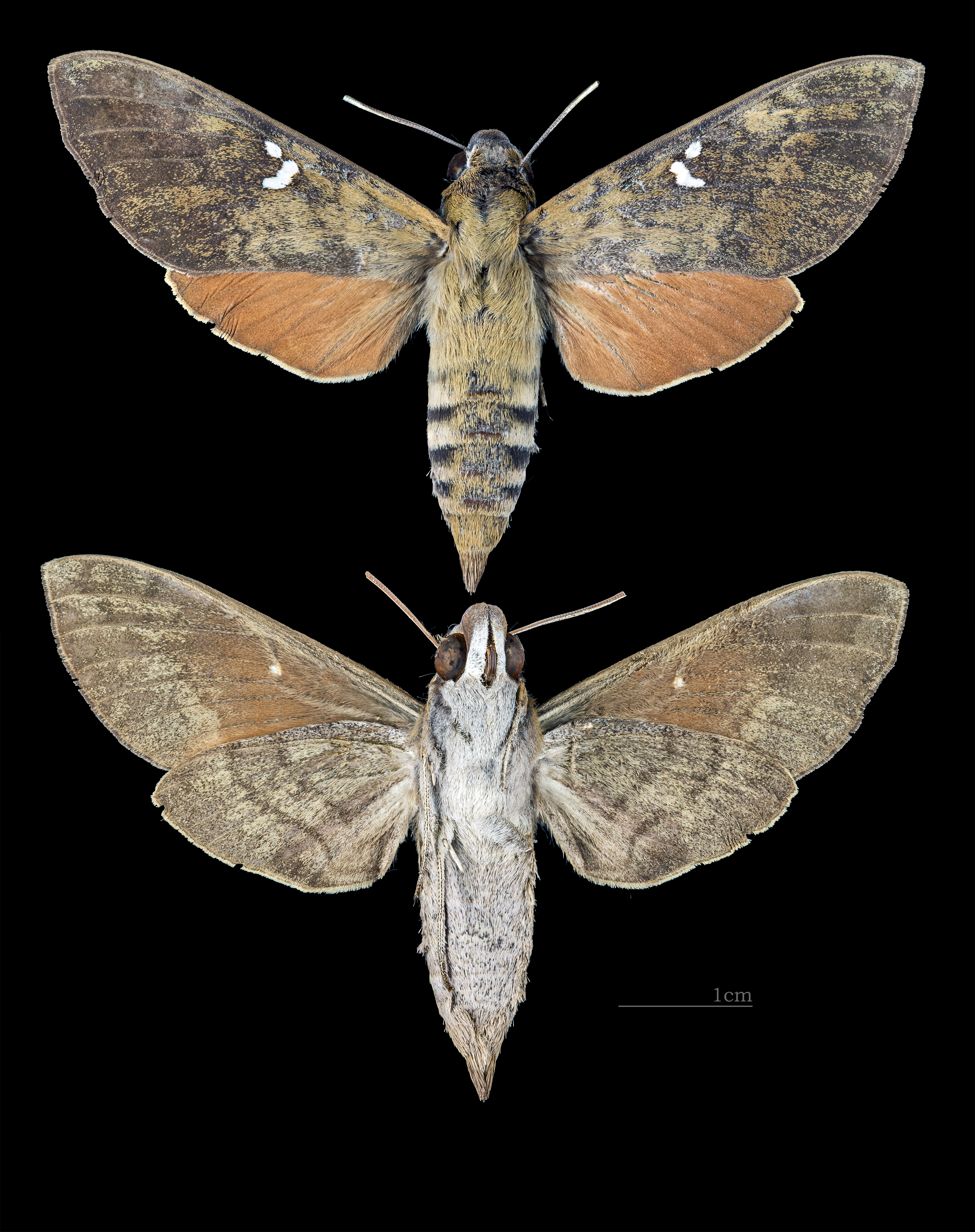

Scientific classification
- Kingdom: Animalia
- Phylum: Arthropoda
- Class: Insecta
- Order: Lepidoptera
- Family: Sphingidae
- Genus: Nephele
- Species: N. subvaria

Binomial name
- Nephele subvaria (Walker, 1856)

Synonyms
- Zonilia subvaria Walker, 1856; Deilephila dalii Newman, 1857; Zonilia antipoda Walker, 1865; Zonilia metapyrrha Walker, 1856

= Nephele subvaria =

Species of moth

Nephele subvaria is a species of moth in the family Sphingidae.

== Distribution ==
It is known from Queensland and Western Australia.

== Description ==
The wingspan is about 60 mm.

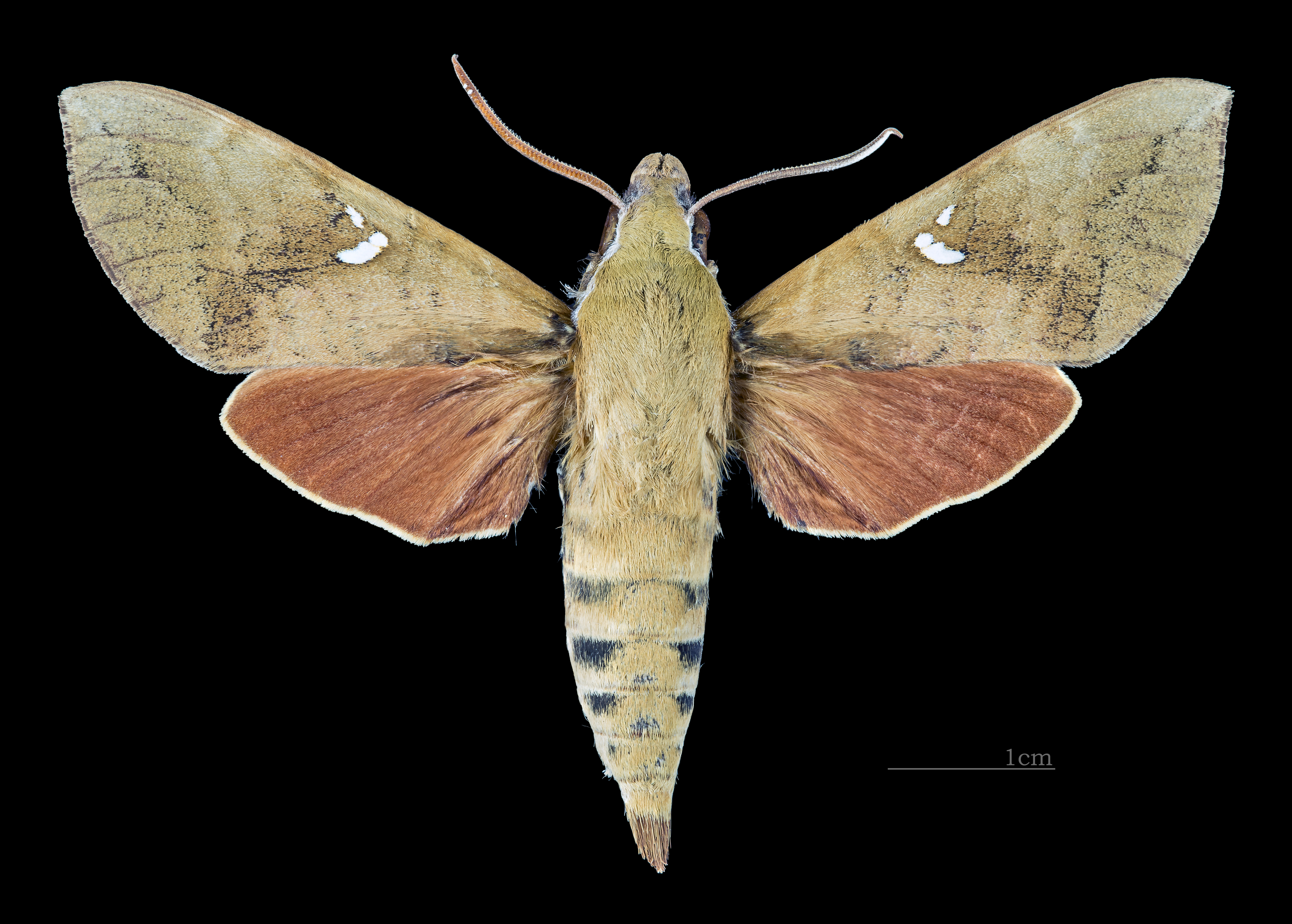
Male dorsal
(coll.MHNT)

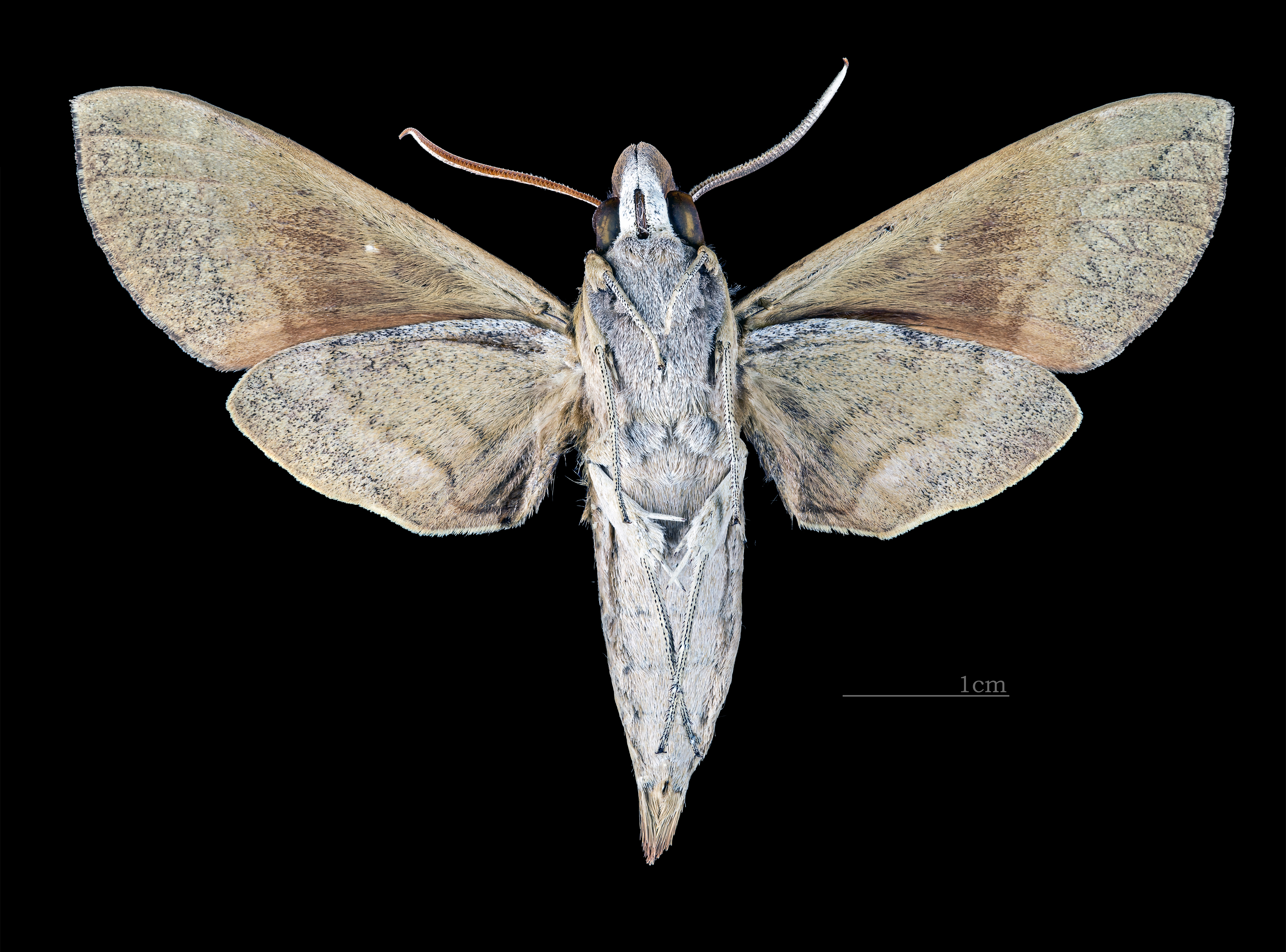
Male ventral
(coll.MHNT)

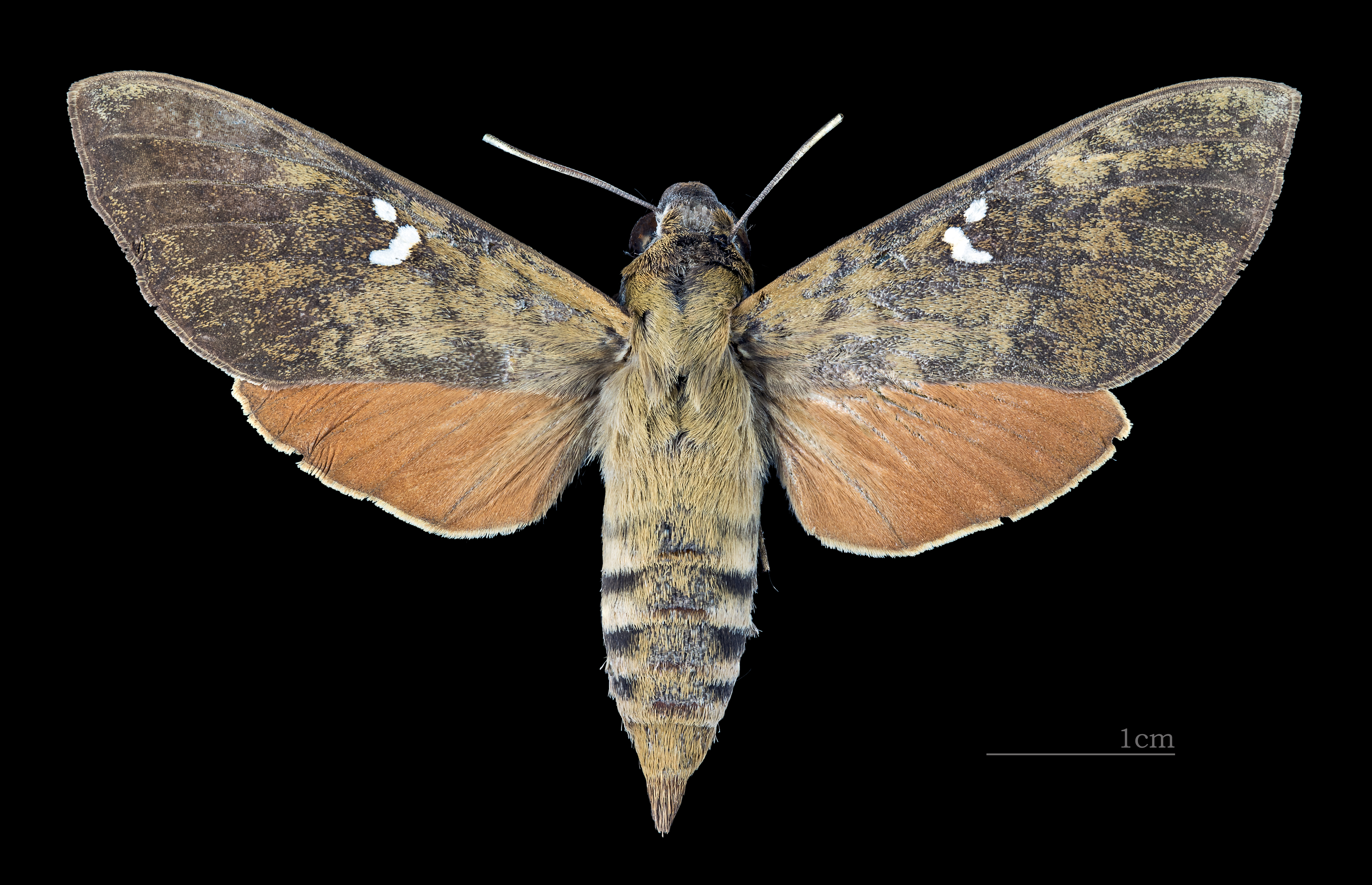
Female dorsal
(coll.MHNT)

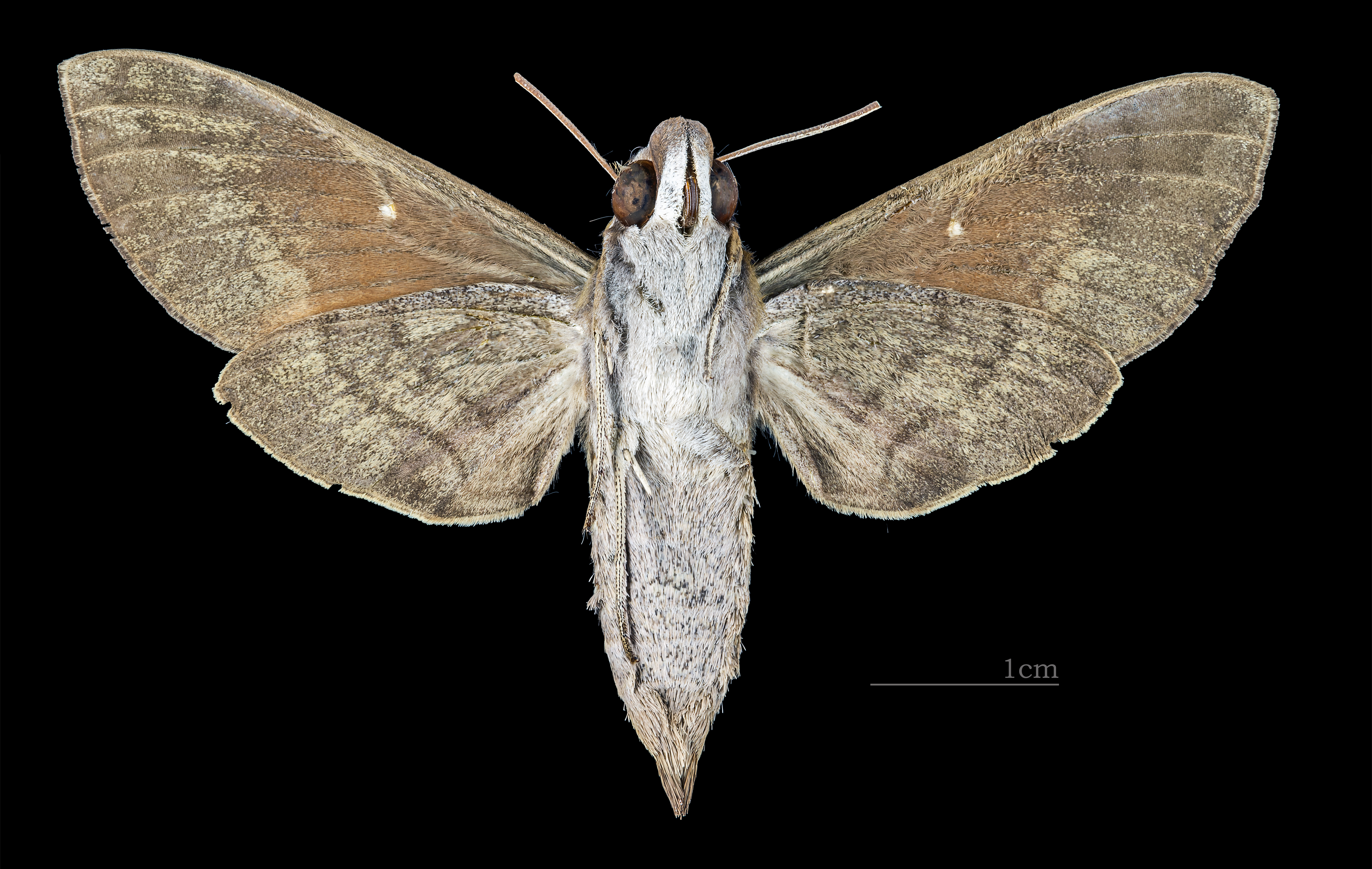
Female ventral
(coll.MHNT)

== Biology ==
The larvae feed on Carissa spinarum.
