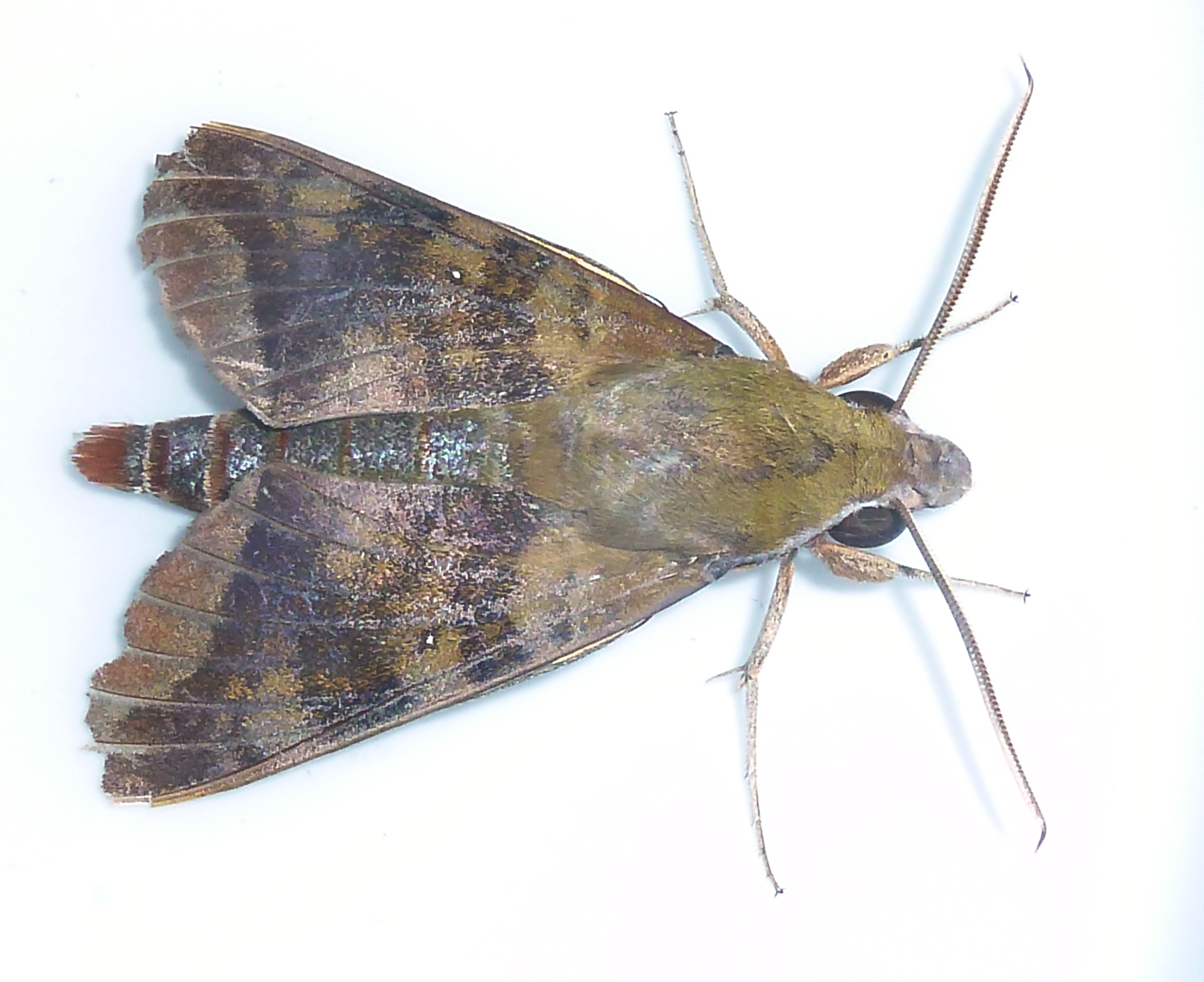

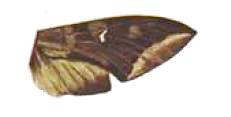

Scientific classification
- Kingdom: Animalia
- Phylum: Arthropoda
- Class: Insecta
- Order: Lepidoptera
- Family: Sphingidae
- Genus: Nephele
- Species: N. comma

Binomial name
- Nephele comma Hopffer, 1857

Synonyms
- Nephele triangulifera Closs, 1914; Nephele charoba Kirby, 1877; Nephele charoba microstigma (Clark, 1927); Nephele comma derasa Rothschild & Jordan, 1903

= Nephele comma =

Comma nephele hawk moth

Species of moth

Nephele comma is a moth of the family Sphingidae. It is very common throughout the Ethiopian Region, including Madagascar.

== Food plants ==
The larvae feed on the leaves of Carissa species.
