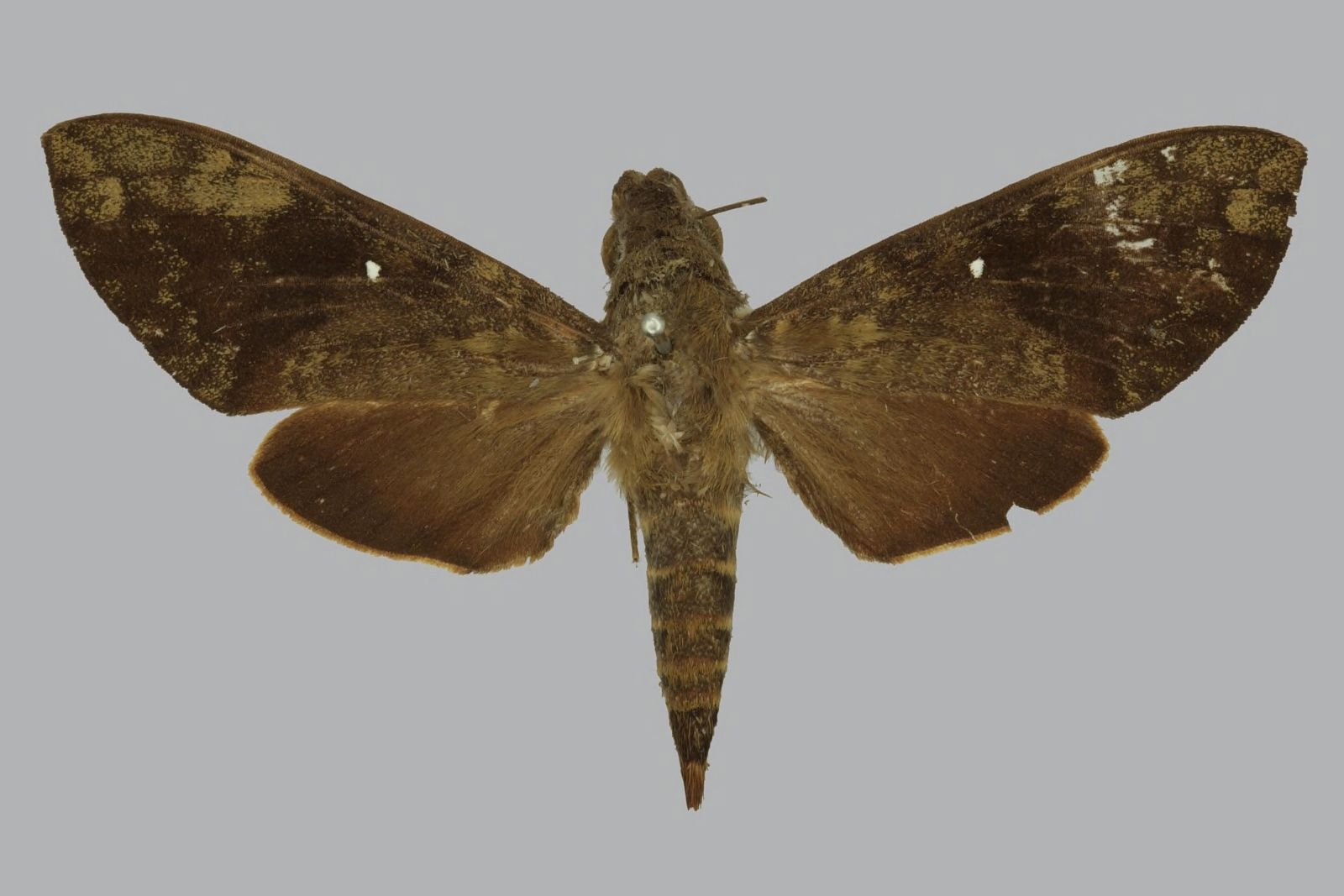

Scientific classification
- Kingdom: Animalia
- Phylum: Arthropoda
- Class: Insecta
- Order: Lepidoptera
- Family: Sphingidae
- Genus: Nephele
- Species: N. monostigma

Binomial name
- Nephele monostigma Clark, 1925

= Nephele monostigma =

Species of moth

Nephele monostigma is a species of moth in the family Sphingidae. It is known from highland forests in the Cameroon, Uganda and Kenya.
