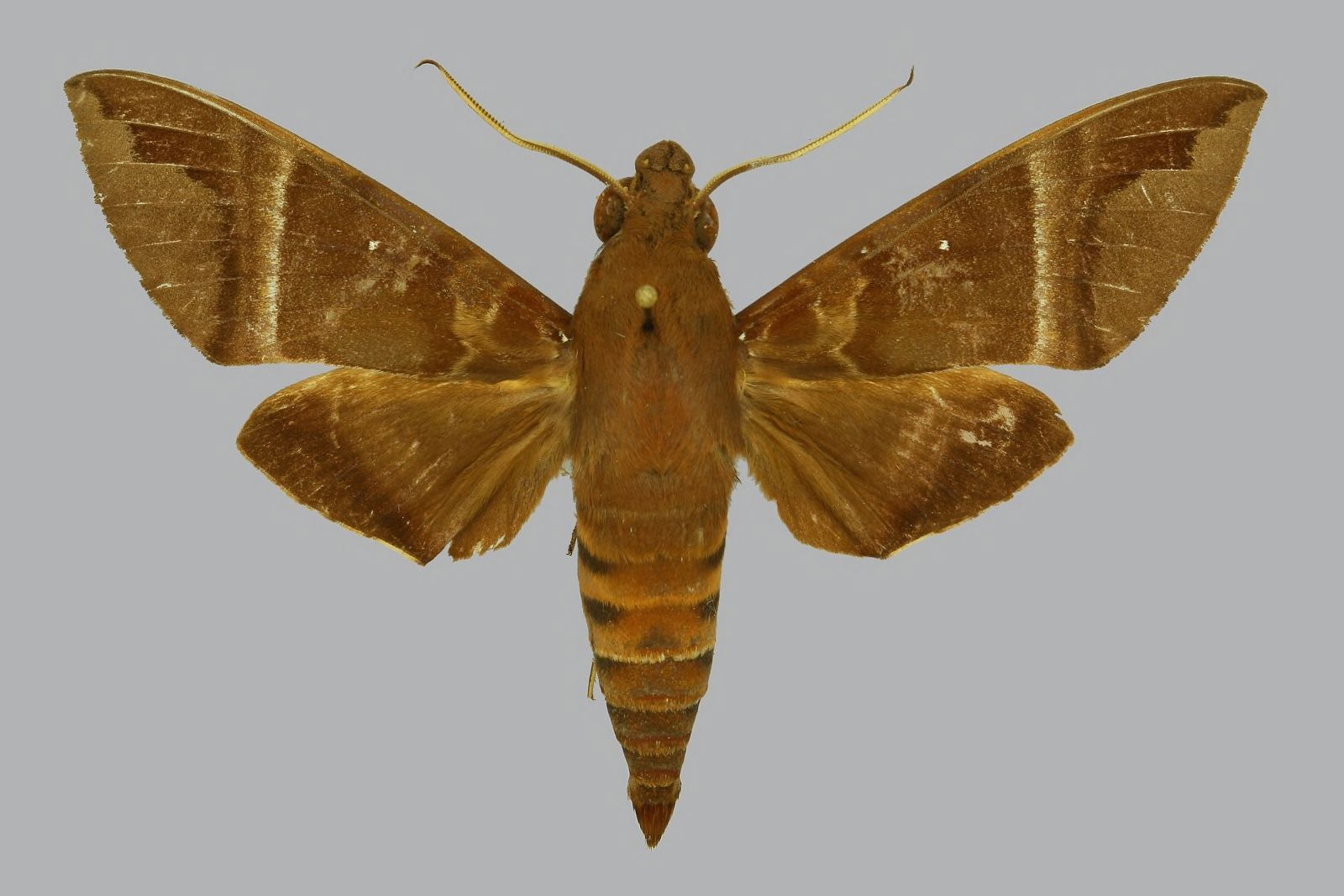

Scientific classification
- Kingdom: Animalia
- Phylum: Arthropoda
- Class: Insecta
- Order: Lepidoptera
- Family: Sphingidae
- Genus: Nephele
- Species: N. oenopion

Binomial name
- Nephele oenopion (Hubner, 1824)

Synonyms
- Orneus oenopion Hübner, 1824

= Nephele oenopion =

Species of moth

Nephele oenopion is a moth of the family Sphingidae. It is known from Africa.

The larvae feed on Mussaenda arcuata.

== Subspecies ==
- Nephele oenopion oenopion (from Gabon to Tanzania and Kenya and Madagascar)
- Nephele oenopion continentis Rothschild & Jordan, 1903 (forests from Sierra Leone to Congo and East Africa)
- Nephele oenopion stictica Rothschild & Jordan, 1903 (Comoro Islands)
- Nephele oenopion transitoria Turlin, 1996 (Comoro Islands)
