= Isophrictis actinopa =

Scientific classification
- Domain: Eukaryota
- Kingdom: Animalia
- Phylum: Arthropoda
- Class: Insecta
- Order: Lepidoptera
- Family: Gelechiidae
- Genus: Isophrictis
- Species: I. actinopa

Binomial name
- Isophrictis actinopa Meyrick, 1929

Species of moth

Isophrictis actinopa is a moth of the family Gelechiidae, described by Edward Meyrick in 1929. It is found in North America, where it has been recorded from Texas.
