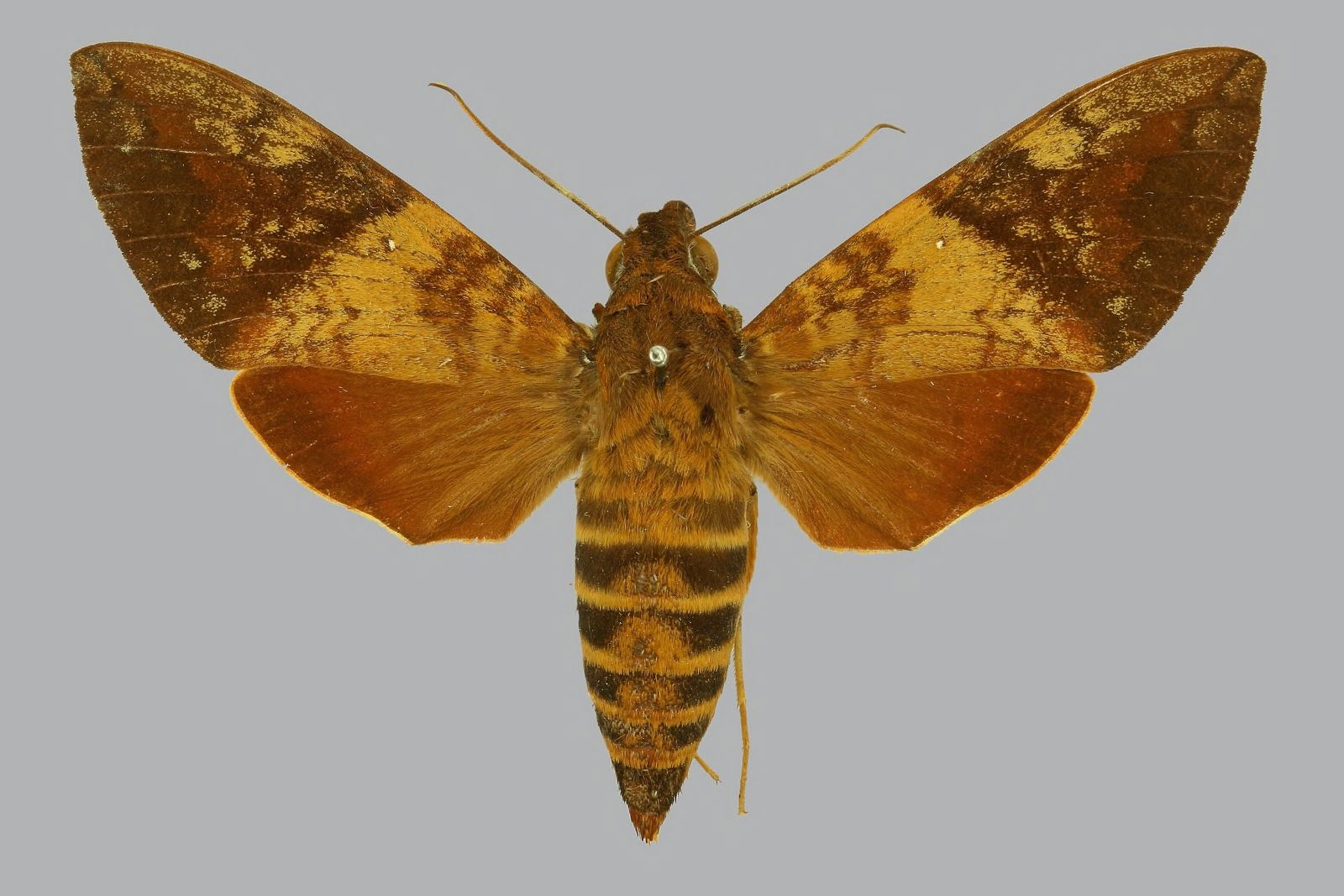

Scientific classification
- Kingdom: Animalia
- Phylum: Arthropoda
- Class: Insecta
- Order: Lepidoptera
- Family: Sphingidae
- Genus: Nephele
- Species: N. bipartita

Binomial name
- Nephele bipartita Butler, 1878

= Nephele bipartita =

Species of moth

Nephele bipartita is a moth of the family Sphingidae. It is known from lowland forest and heavy woodland from West Africa to the coast of Kenya and Tanzania and to Malawi and Mozambique.
