= Isophrictis cerdanica =

Scientific classification
- Domain: Eukaryota
- Kingdom: Animalia
- Phylum: Arthropoda
- Class: Insecta
- Order: Lepidoptera
- Family: Gelechiidae
- Genus: Isophrictis
- Species: I. cerdanica

Binomial name
- Isophrictis cerdanica Nel, 1995

Species of moth

Isophrictis cerdanica is a moth of the family Gelechiidae. It was described by Jacques Nel in 1995. It is found in Spain.
