= Isophrictis oudianella =

Scientific classification
- Domain: Eukaryota
- Kingdom: Animalia
- Phylum: Arthropoda
- Class: Insecta
- Order: Lepidoptera
- Family: Gelechiidae
- Genus: Isophrictis
- Species: I. oudianella

Binomial name
- Isophrictis oudianella (D. Lucas, 1942)

Synonyms
- Paltodora oudianella D. Lucas, 1942

Species of moth

Isophrictis oudianella is a moth of the family Gelechiidae. It was described by Daniel Lucas in 1942. It is found in Tunisia.
