= Isophrictis occidentalis =

Scientific classification
- Domain: Eukaryota
- Kingdom: Animalia
- Phylum: Arthropoda
- Class: Insecta
- Order: Lepidoptera
- Family: Gelechiidae
- Genus: Isophrictis
- Species: I. occidentalis

Binomial name
- Isophrictis occidentalis Braun, 1925

Species of moth

Isophrictis occidentalis is a moth of the family Gelechiidae. It was described by Annette Frances Braun in 1925. It is found in North America, where it has been recorded from Utah.
