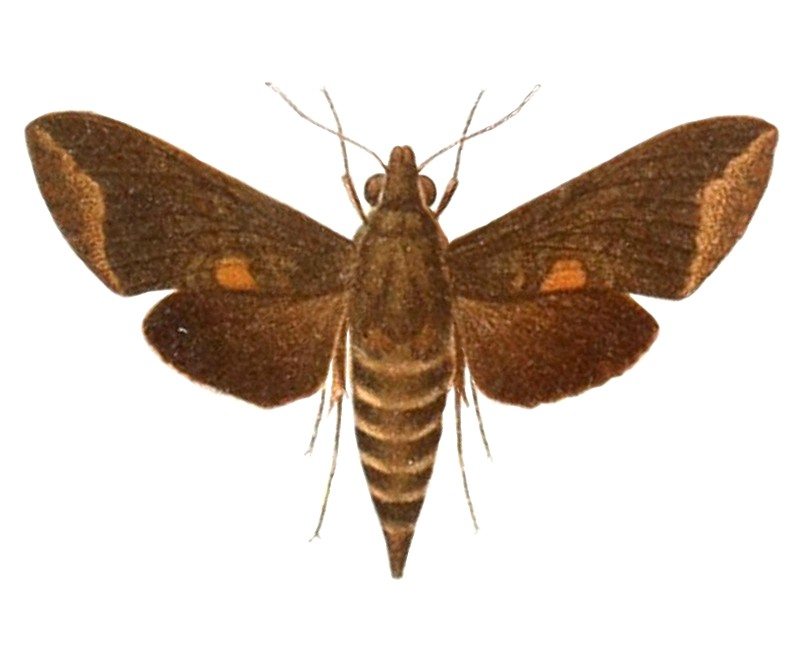

Scientific classification
- Kingdom: Animalia
- Phylum: Arthropoda
- Class: Insecta
- Order: Lepidoptera
- Family: Sphingidae
- Genus: Nephele
- Species: N. discifera

Binomial name
- Nephele discifera Karsch, 1891

Synonyms
- Nephele aureomaculata Rothschild, 1894; Nephele discifera rattraya (Rothschild, 1904)

= Nephele discifera =

Species of moth

Nephele discifera is a moth of the family Sphingidae. It is known from forests from Liberia and Ghana to Congo and Uganda.
