= Isophrictis constantina =

Scientific classification
- Domain: Eukaryota
- Kingdom: Animalia
- Phylum: Arthropoda
- Class: Insecta
- Order: Lepidoptera
- Family: Gelechiidae
- Genus: Isophrictis
- Species: I. constantina

Binomial name
- Isophrictis constantina (Baker, 1888)

Synonyms
- Cleodora constantina Baker, 1888

Species of moth

Isophrictis constantina is a moth of the family Gelechiidae. It was described by Baker in 1888. It is found in Algeria.

The wingspan is 16–17 mm. The forewings are greyish-brown, with a small dark central dash in a white streak, followed by a small dark dash in a white streak, which is again followed posteriorly by an indistinct dark dot surrounded with white near the costa. These white markings form a sort of broken, oblique, whitish shading from just in front of the apex to the centre of the wing. Immediately before the apex, which is strongly bordered with black, are two very short, oblique, parallel lines. The hindwings are darkish grey.
