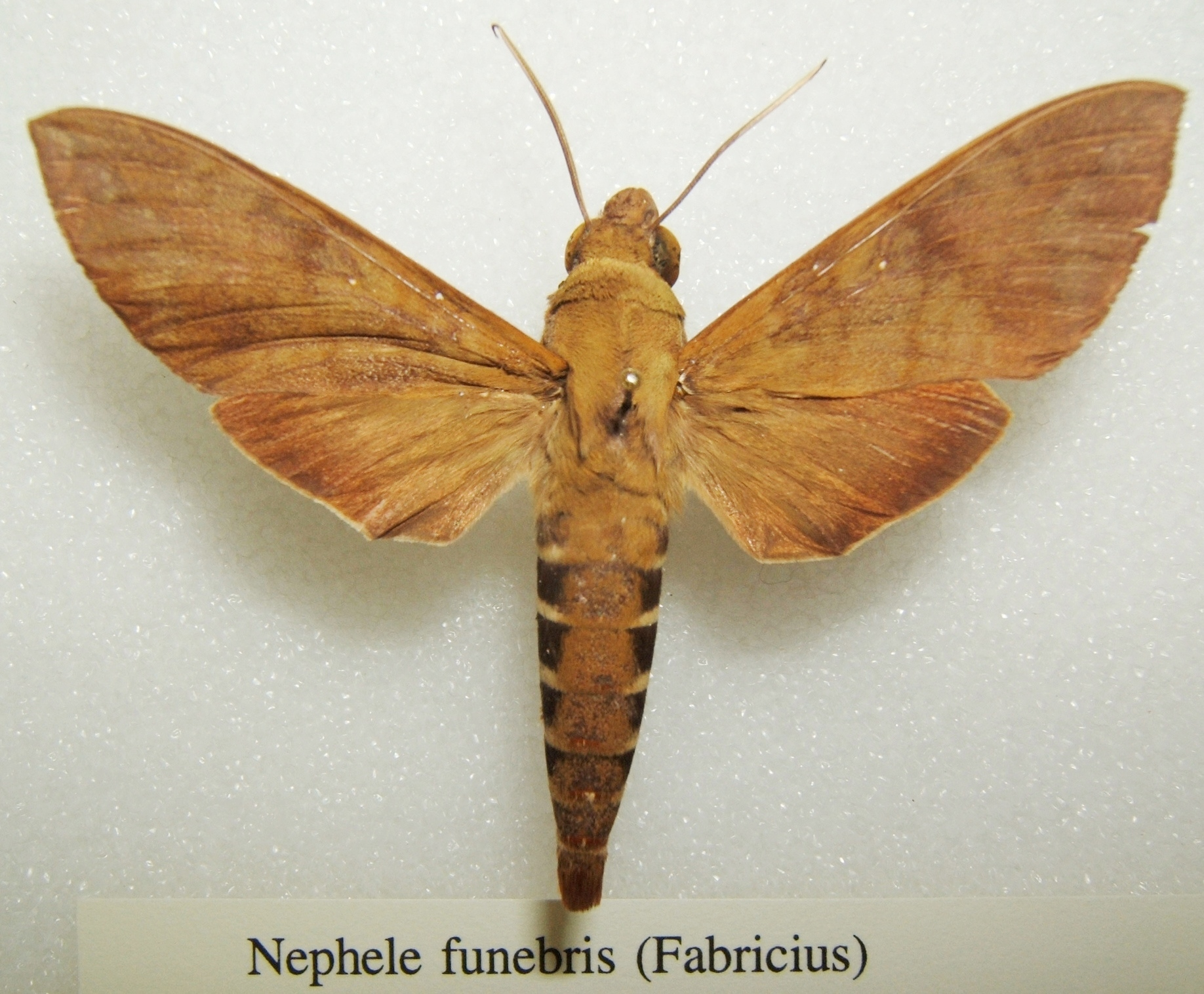

Scientific classification
- Kingdom: Animalia
- Phylum: Arthropoda
- Class: Insecta
- Order: Lepidoptera
- Family: Sphingidae
- Genus: Nephele
- Species: N. funebris

Binomial name
- Nephele funebris (Fabricius, 1793)

Synonyms
- Sphinx funebris Fabricius, 1793; Nephele infernalis Kirby, 1877; Zonilia viridescens Walker, 1856; Nephele funebris conimaculata (Rothschild & Jordan, 1903)

= Nephele funebris =

Species of moth

Nephele funebris is a moth of the family Sphingidae.
