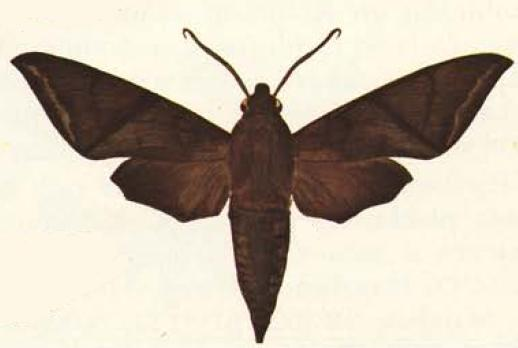

Scientific classification
- Kingdom: Animalia
- Phylum: Arthropoda
- Class: Insecta
- Order: Lepidoptera
- Family: Sphingidae
- Genus: Nephele
- Species: N. aequivalens

Binomial name
- Nephele aequivalens (Walker, 1856)

Synonyms
- Pachylia aequivalens Walker, 1856; Zonilia zebu Boisduval, 1875

= Nephele aequivalens =

Species of moth

Nephele aequivalens is a moth of the family Sphingidae. It is known from forests up to 5,000 feet and heavy woodland throughout tropical Africa.
