= Isophrictis modesta =

Scientific classification
- Domain: Eukaryota
- Kingdom: Animalia
- Phylum: Arthropoda
- Class: Insecta
- Order: Lepidoptera
- Family: Gelechiidae
- Genus: Isophrictis
- Species: I. modesta

Binomial name
- Isophrictis modesta (Walsingham, 1888)

Synonyms
- Cleodora modesta Walsingham, 1888

Species of moth

Isophrictis modesta is a moth of the family Gelechiidae. It was described by Thomas de Grey, 6th Baron Walsingham, in 1888. It is found in North America, where it has been recorded from California.

The wingspan is 10–11 mm. The forewings are uniform pale umber-brown, dotted around the apex with intermixed fuscous and hoary scales. A line of white runs also through the middle of the apical cilia. The hindwings are pale greyish.
