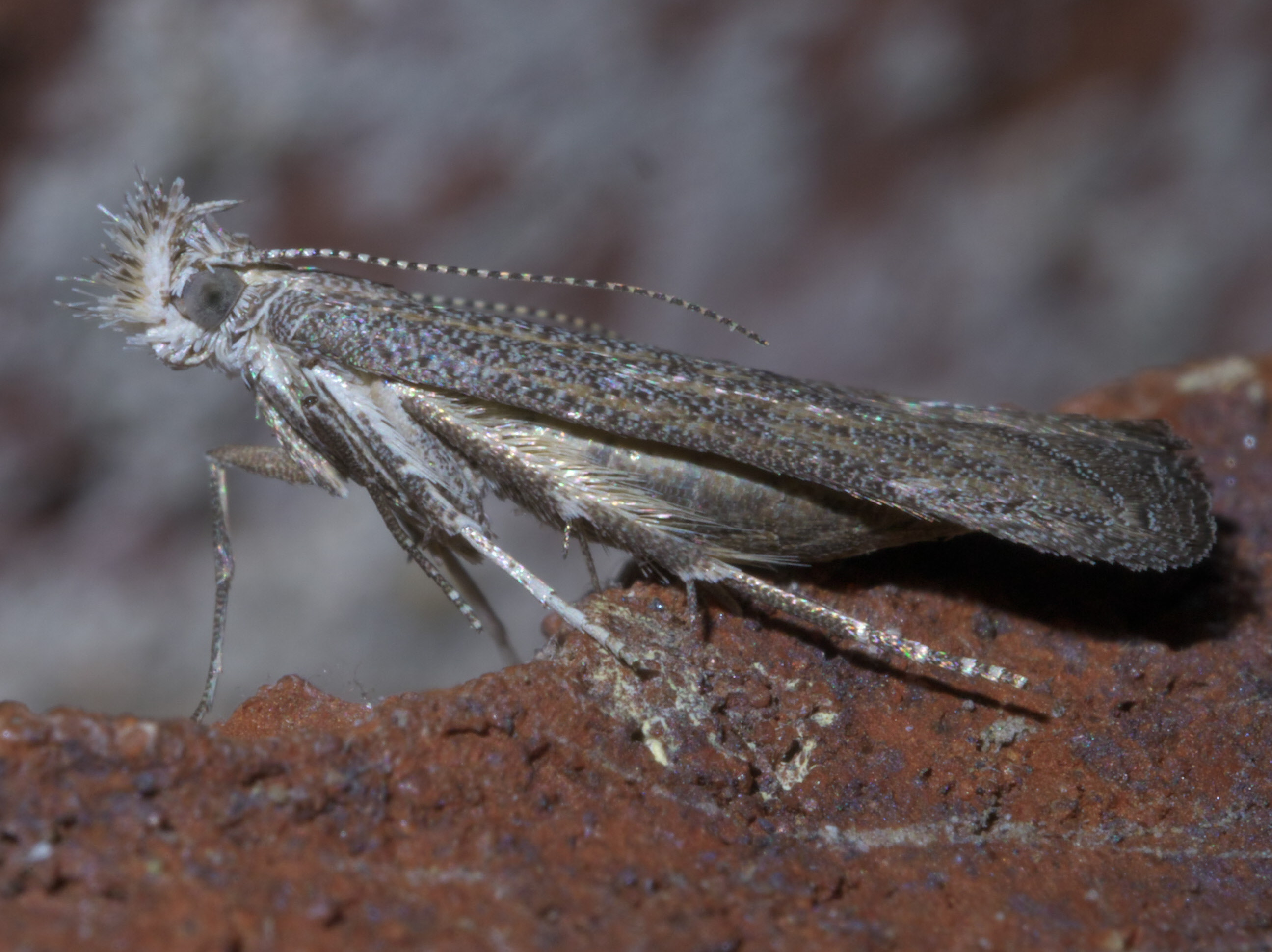
- Isophrictis similiella (possibly Isophrictis magnella)

Scientific classification
- Kingdom: Animalia
- Phylum: Arthropoda
- Clade: Pancrustacea
- Class: Insecta
- Order: Lepidoptera
- Family: Gelechiidae
- Genus: Isophrictis
- Species: I. similiella

Binomial name
- Isophrictis similiella (Chambers, 1872)

Synonyms
- Gelechia similiella Chambers, 1872; Gelechia solaniiella Chambers, 1873; Gelechia (Doryphora) piscipellis Zeller, 1873

= Isophrictis similiella =

Species of moth

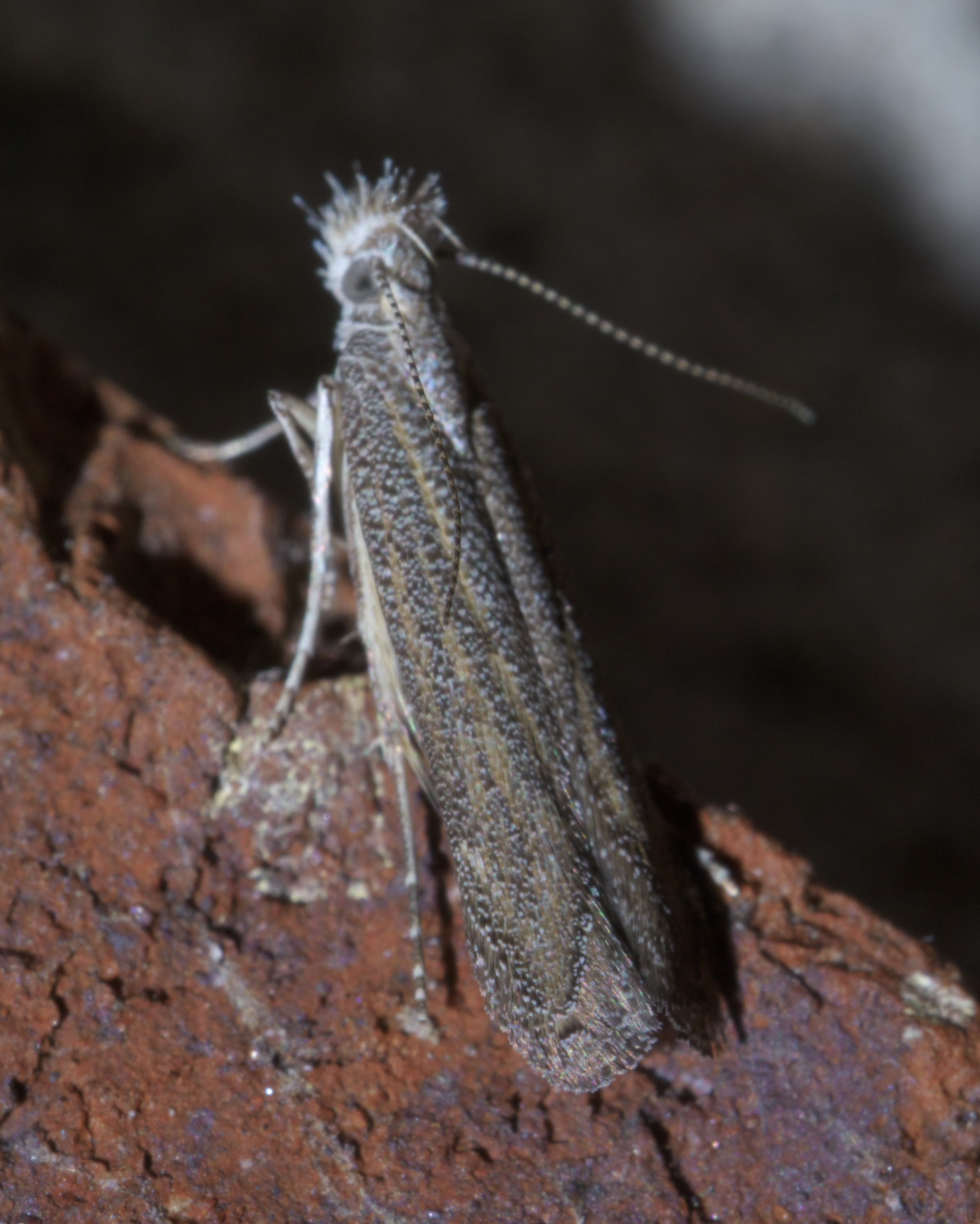
Isophrictis similiella (possibly Isophrictis magnella), Size: 8.6 mm

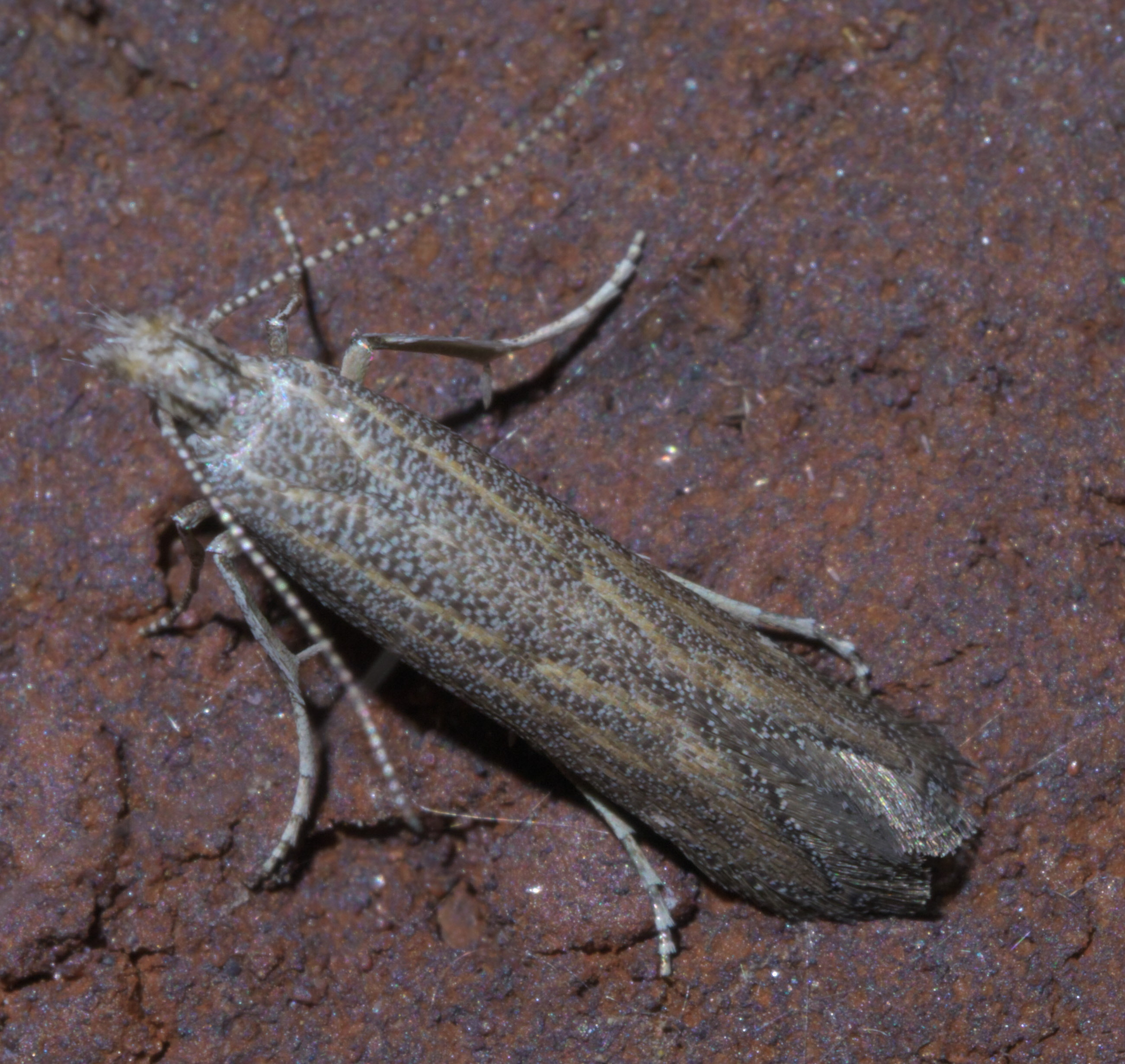
Isophrictis similiella (possibly Isophrictis magnella)

Isophrictis similiella is a moth of the family Gelechiidae. It was described by Vactor Tousey Chambers in 1872. It is found in North America, where it has been recorded from Kentucky, Arkansas, Illinois, Indiana, Maine, Manitoba, Massachusetts, Oklahoma, Pennsylvania, Saskatchewan and Texas.

The wingspan is about 11 mm.

The larvae bore in the receptacle of Solanum carolinense and the flowerheads of Rudbeckia hirta.
