= Georg Adolf Keferstein =

German lawyer and entomologist

- Born: October 10, 1793; Halle (Saale)
- Died: November 28, 1884 (aged 91); Erfurt
- Known for: Entomological research, collection of butterflies
- Scientific career
- Fields: Entomology

Georg Adolf Keferstein (October 10, 1793 – November 28, 1884) was a German lawyer (most recently in Erfurt) and entomologist.

Georg Keferstein was born in Halle (Saale), and collected butterflies from his youth and published specifically on the history of entomology, for example about the silkworm in antiquity. An example is Der Bombyx oder Bombylius des Aristoteles als Seide hervorbringendes Insekt. Verhandlungen k.u.k. Zoolog.-Botan. Ges. Wien, 1882. He published in the Revue Entomologique edited by Gustave Silbermann, in Isis edited by Lorenz Oken, in the proceedings of the Imperial Zoological and Botanical Society and in the Szczecin Entomology Journal.

First descriptions from his extensive collection were mostly by Gottlieb August Herrich-Schäffer. He himself described Tritonaclia tollini amongst other species. The Keferstein collection is held by the University of Halle together with his valuable entomological library. Keferstein was a member of the Halle Masonic Lodge. He died in Erfurt.
