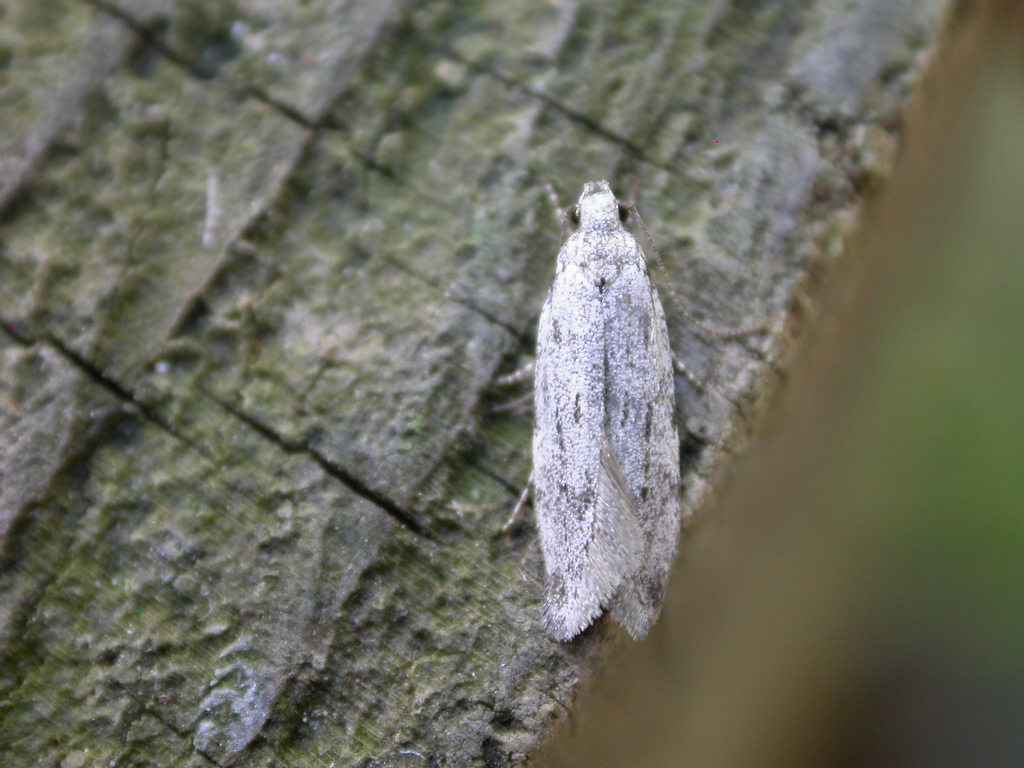
- Teleiodes saltuum

Scientific classification
- Kingdom: Animalia
- Phylum: Arthropoda
- Class: Insecta
- Order: Lepidoptera
- Family: Gelechiidae
- Tribe: Litini
- Genus: Teleiodes; Sattler, 1960

Type species
- Tinea vulgella Denis & Schiffermüller, 1775

Synonyms
- Teleia Heinemann, 1870 (preocc. Hübner, [1825]); Dubitationis Omelko & Omelko, 1998

= Teleiodes =

Genus of moths

Teleiodes is a genus of moths in the family Gelechiidae.

== Species ==
- Teleiodes albidorsella Huemer & Karsholt, 1999
- Teleiodes albiluculella Huemer & Karsholt, 2001
- Teleiodes bradleyi Park, 1992
- Teleiodes brevivalva Huemer, 1992
- Teleiodes cyrtocostella Park, 1992
- Teleiodes excentricella (Turati, 1934)
- Teleiodes flavimaculella (Herrich-Schaffer, 1854)
- Teleiodes flavipunctatella Park, 1992
- Teleiodes gangwonensis Park & Ponomarenko, 2007
- Teleiodes hortensis Li & Zheng, 1996
- Teleiodes italica Huemer, 1992
- Teleiodes kaitilai Junnilainen, 2010
- Teleiodes klaussattleri Park, 1992
- Teleiodes linearivalvata (Moriuti, 1977)
- Teleiodes luculella (Hübner, 1813)
- Teleiodes murina (Omelko & Omelko, 1998)
- Teleiodes orientalis Park, 1992
- Teleiodes paraluculella Park, 1992
- Teleiodes pekunensis Park, 1993
- Teleiodes qinghaiensis Li, 1999
- Teleiodes saltuum (Zeller, 1878)
- Teleiodes soyangae Park, 1992
- Teleiodes vulgella (Denis & Schiffermuller, 1775)
- Teleiodes wagae (Nowicki, 1860)

== Former species ==
- Teleiodes aenigma Sattler, 1983
- Teleiodes alburnella (Zeller, 1839)
- Teleiodes anguinella (Herrich-Schäffer, 1861)
- Teleiodes angustipennis (Rebel, 1931)
- Teleiodes brucinella (Mann, 1872)
- Teleiodes cisti (Stainton, 1869)
- Teleiodes decorella (Haworth, 1812)
- Teleiodes epomidella (Tengström, 1869)
- Teleiodes femoralis (Staudinger, 1876)
- Teleiodes fugacella (Zeller, 1839)
- Teleiodes fugitivella (Zeller, 1839)
- Teleiodes gallica Huemer, 1992
- Teleiodes minor Kasy, 1978
- Teleiodes myricariella (Frey, 1870)
- Teleiodes notatella (Hübner, 1813)
- Teleiodes ostentella (Zerny, 1934)
- Teleiodes paripunctella (Thunberg, 1794)
- Teleiodes proximella (Hübner, 1796)
- Teleiodes squamodorella (Amsel, 1935)
- Teleiodes squamulella (Peyerimhoff, 1871)
- Teleiodes thomeriella (Chrétien, 1901)
- Teleiodes vovkella (Piskunov, 1973)
