= Carpatolechia =

Scientific classification
- Kingdom: Animalia
- Phylum: Arthropoda
- Class: Insecta
- Order: Lepidoptera
- Family: Gelechiidae
- Subfamily: Gelechiinae
- Tribe: Litini
- Genus: Carpatolechia; Capuse, 1964

Synonyms
- Vicina Omelko, 1999

Genus of moths

Carpatolechia is a genus of moths in the family Gelechiidae.

== Species ==
- Carpatolechia aenigma (Sattler, 1983)
- Carpatolechia alburnella (Zeller, 1839)
- Carpatolechia daehania (Park, 1993)
- Carpatolechia decorella (Haworth, 1812)
- Carpatolechia deogyusanae (Park, 1992)
- Carpatolechia digitilobella (Park, 1992)
- Carpatolechia epomidella (Tengström, 1869)
- Carpatolechia filipjevi (Lvovsky & Piskunov, 1993)
- Carpatolechia fugacella (Zeller, 1839)
- Carpatolechia fugitivella (Zeller, 1839)
- Carpatolechia intermediella Huemer & Karsholt, 1999
- Carpatolechia longivalvella (Park, 1992)
- Carpatolechia minor (Kasy, 1978)
- Carpatolechia notatella (Hübner, [1813])
- Carpatolechia proximella (Hübner, 1796)
- Carpatolechia yangyangensis (Park, 1992)

== Former species ==
- Carpatolechia buckwelli
- Carpatolechia deserta
- Carpatolechia dodecella
- Carpatolechia dumitrescui
- Carpatolechia erschoffii
- Carpatolechia euratella
- Carpatolechia griseella
- Carpatolechia humeralella
- Carpatolechia humeralis
- Carpatolechia incretella
- Carpatolechia inscriptella
- Carpatolechia lyellella
- Carpatolechia melanostictella
- Carpatolechia mersinella
- Carpatolechia myricae
- Carpatolechia nigrofasciella
- Carpatolechia ochracella
- Carpatolechia oskella
- Carpatolechia paripunctella
- Carpatolechia peritella
- Carpatolechia praedicata
- Carpatolechia radiella
- Carpatolechia sagittella
- Carpatolechia scabra
- Carpatolechia signatella
- Carpatolechia subericolella
- Carpatolechia sultanella
- Carpatolechia tigratella
- Carpatolechia tribolopis
- Carpatolechia trijugella
- Carpatolechia triparella
