= Teleiodes brevivalva =

Scientific classification
- Kingdom: Animalia
- Phylum: Arthropoda
- Clade: Pancrustacea
- Class: Insecta
- Order: Lepidoptera
- Family: Gelechiidae
- Genus: Teleiodes
- Species: T. brevivalva

Binomial name
- Teleiodes brevivalva Huemer, 1992

Species of moth

Teleiodes brevivalva is a moth of the family Gelechiidae. It is found in northern Italy and Spain.

The length of the forewings is 6-6.1 mm. Adults are identical to Teleiodes vulgella.
