= Teleiodes hortensis =

Scientific classification
- Domain: Eukaryota
- Kingdom: Animalia
- Phylum: Arthropoda
- Class: Insecta
- Order: Lepidoptera
- Family: Gelechiidae
- Genus: Teleiodes
- Species: T. hortensis

Binomial name
- Teleiodes hortensis Li & Zheng, 1996

Species of moth

Teleiodes hortensis is a moth of the family Gelechiidae. It is found in China.

Adults are similar to Teleiodes luculella, but can be distinguished by the absence of the large white speckle at the middle of the forewings.
