= Teleiodes italica =

Scientific classification
- Kingdom: Animalia
- Phylum: Arthropoda
- Clade: Pancrustacea
- Class: Insecta
- Order: Lepidoptera
- Family: Gelechiidae
- Genus: Teleiodes
- Species: T. italica

Binomial name
- Teleiodes italica Huemer, 1992

Synonyms
- Teleiodes gallica Huemer, 1992

Species of moth

Teleiodes italica is a moth of the family Gelechiidae. It is found in Switzerland, northern Italy, southern France and Spain.

The length of the forewings is 4.5–6.5 mm. Adults are identical to Teleiodes vulgella.

The larvae feed on Sorbus aucuparia and Crataegus and Cydonia species.

== Etymology ==
The species is named for Italy, where it was first discovered.
