= Teleiodes pekunensis =

Scientific classification
- Kingdom: Animalia
- Phylum: Arthropoda
- Class: Insecta
- Order: Lepidoptera
- Family: Gelechiidae
- Genus: Teleiodes
- Species: T. pekunensis

Binomial name
- Teleiodes pekunensis Park, 1993

Species of moth

Teleiodes pekunensis is a moth of the family Gelechiidae. It is found in South Korea and Japan.

The wingspan is 12.5–13.5 mm (0.49–0.53 in). Adults are identical to Telphusa necromantis and can only be distinguished by the genitalia of both sexes.
