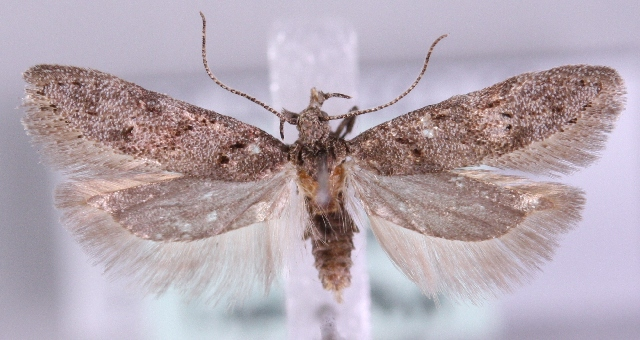

Scientific classification
- Domain: Eukaryota
- Kingdom: Animalia
- Phylum: Arthropoda
- Class: Insecta
- Order: Lepidoptera
- Family: Gelechiidae
- Genus: Teleiodes
- Species: T. wagae

Binomial name
- Teleiodes wagae (Nowicki, 1860)

Synonyms
- Gelechia wagae Nowicki, 1860; Teleiodes marsata Piskunov, 1973

= Teleiodes wagae =

Species of moth

Teleiodes wagae, the hazel groundling, is a moth of the family Gelechiidae. It is found throughout Europe, east to Siberia.

The wingspan is 9–13 mm. Very similar to Teleiodes vulgella. Certain identification requires examination of the genitalia.

Adults are on wing from May to June.

The larvae feed on Corylus avellana, Betula, Castanea sativa and Salix caprea. They feed between two spun leaves of their host plant. Larvae can be found from August to September.
