= Teleiodes linearivalvata =

Scientific classification
- Kingdom: Animalia
- Phylum: Arthropoda
- Clade: Pancrustacea
- Class: Insecta
- Order: Lepidoptera
- Family: Gelechiidae
- Genus: Teleiodes
- Species: T. linearivalvata

Binomial name
- Teleiodes linearivalvata (Moriuti, 1977)

Synonyms
- Telphusa linearivalvata Moriuti, 1977

Species of moth

Teleiodes linearivalvata is a moth of the family Gelechiidae. It is found in South Korea and Japan.

The wingspan is 13–17 mm. Adults are similar to Telphusa syncratopa. Adults are on wing from the end of May to mid-August.
