= Istrianis nigrosquamella =

Scientific classification
- Domain: Eukaryota
- Kingdom: Animalia
- Phylum: Arthropoda
- Class: Insecta
- Order: Lepidoptera
- Family: Gelechiidae
- Genus: Istrianis
- Species: I. nigrosquamella

Binomial name
- Istrianis nigrosquamella (Amsel, 1959)

Synonyms
- Pseudoteleia nigrosquamella Amsel, 1959

Species of moth

Istrianis nigrosquamella is a moth of the family Gelechiidae. It is found in Iran.

The wingspan is 10.5–11 mm. Adults are similar to Istrianis squamodorella.
