= Telphusa callitechna =

Scientific classification
- Domain: Eukaryota
- Kingdom: Animalia
- Phylum: Arthropoda
- Class: Insecta
- Order: Lepidoptera
- Family: Gelechiidae
- Genus: Telphusa
- Species: T. callitechna

Binomial name
- Telphusa callitechna Meyrick, 1914

Synonyms
- Mompha praefinita Meyrick, 1917

Species of moth

Telphusa callitechna is a moth of the family Gelechiidae. It is found in Guyana and French Guiana.

The wingspan is about 13 mm. The forewings are lilac-fuscous with a dark fuscous basal patch becoming blackish posteriorly, its margin edged with white and running from about one-fourth of the costa to the middle of the dorsum, rather angular, prominent near the costa and below the middle, sinuate between these. This is followed by a posteriorly undefined fascia of whitish-ochreous suffusion and there is a blackish partially whitish-circled dot towards the costa at three-fifths and a blotch of dark fuscous suffusion resting on the costa beyond this, its posterior edge oblique and suffused with blackish, followed on the costa by a whitish-ochreous spot. There are tufts towards the dorsum beyond the middle and towards the tornus. The hindwings are grey-whitish, posteriorly suffused with grey, the veins and termen suffused with dark grey.
