= Carpatolechia filipjevi =

Scientific classification
- Kingdom: Animalia
- Phylum: Arthropoda
- Clade: Pancrustacea
- Class: Insecta
- Order: Lepidoptera
- Family: Gelechiidae
- Genus: Carpatolechia
- Species: C. filipjevi

Binomial name
- Carpatolechia filipjevi (Lvovsky & Piskunov, 1993)

Synonyms
- Teleiodes filipjevi Lvovsky & Piskunov, 1993

Species of moth

Carpatolechia filipjevi is a moth of the family Gelechiidae. It is found in Russia (southern Ural and southern Siberia).
