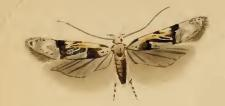
- Altenia scriptella

Scientific classification
- Kingdom: Animalia
- Phylum: Arthropoda
- Class: Insecta
- Order: Lepidoptera
- Family: Gelechiidae
- Tribe: Litini
- Genus: Altenia; Sattler, 1960

= Altenia =

Genus of moths

Altenia is a genus of moths in the family Gelechiidae. It is found Europe, Asia, and North Africa. Host plants are known from families Empetraceae, Anacardiaceae, and Aceraceae.

== Species ==
There are seven recognized species:

- Altenia elsneriella Huemer & Karsholt, 1999
- Altenia inscriptella (Christoph, 1882)
- Altenia mersinella (Staudinger, 1879)
- Altenia modesta (Danilevsky, 1955)
- Altenia perspersella (Wocke, 1862)
- Altenia scriptella (Hubner, 1796)
- Altenia wagneriella (Rebel, 1926)
