= Teleiodes albidorsella =

Scientific classification
- Kingdom: Animalia
- Phylum: Arthropoda
- Clade: Pancrustacea
- Class: Insecta
- Order: Lepidoptera
- Family: Gelechiidae
- Genus: Teleiodes
- Species: T. albidorsella

Binomial name
- Teleiodes albidorsella Huemer & Karsholt, 1999

Species of moth

Teleiodes albidorsella is a moth of the family Gelechiidae. It is found in Spain and Portugal.
