= Telphusa semiusta =

Scientific classification
- Domain: Eukaryota
- Kingdom: Animalia
- Phylum: Arthropoda
- Class: Insecta
- Order: Lepidoptera
- Family: Gelechiidae
- Genus: Telphusa
- Species: T. semiusta

Binomial name
- Telphusa semiusta Meyrick, 1922

Species of moth

Telphusa semiusta is a moth of the family Gelechiidae first described by Edward Meyrick in 1922. It is found in Shanghai, China.

The wingspan is about 14 mm. The forewings are dark fuscous with a small black spot in the disc at one-fifth and three pairs of obscure blackish dots in the disc with brownish scale tufts adjoining them posteriorly, the first two pairs with the upper posterior, the third transversely placed on the end of the cell. There is a marginal series of spots of brown suffusion around the posterior fourth of the costa and termen, as well as an indistinct angulated transverse line of whitish sprinkles at three-fourths, with an interrupted longitudinal line of black scales passing through its angle. The hindwings are grey, paler and thinly scaled anteriorly.
