= Altenia modesta =

Scientific classification
- Domain: Eukaryota
- Kingdom: Animalia
- Phylum: Arthropoda
- Class: Insecta
- Order: Lepidoptera
- Family: Gelechiidae
- Genus: Altenia
- Species: A. modesta

Binomial name
- Altenia modesta (Danilevsky, 1955)

Synonyms
- Teleia modesta Danilevsky, 1955

Species of moth

Altenia modesta is a moth of the family Gelechiidae. It is found in Bulgaria, Croatia, Greece, Albania, Armenia, Kyrgyzstan and Algeria.

The wingspan is about 16 mm.

The larvae feed on Pistacia vera.
