= Carpatolechia longivalvella =

Scientific classification
- Kingdom: Animalia
- Phylum: Arthropoda
- Clade: Pancrustacea
- Class: Insecta
- Order: Lepidoptera
- Family: Gelechiidae
- Genus: Carpatolechia
- Species: C. longivalvella

Binomial name
- Carpatolechia longivalvella (Park, 1992)

Synonyms
- Teleiodes longivalvella Park, 1992

Species of moth

Carpatolechia longivalvella is a moth of the family Gelechiidae. It is found in South Korea.

The wingspan of C. longivalvella is 13.5–15 mm.
