= Telphusa incognitella =

Scientific classification
- Domain: Eukaryota
- Kingdom: Animalia
- Phylum: Arthropoda
- Class: Insecta
- Order: Lepidoptera
- Family: Gelechiidae
- Genus: Telphusa
- Species: T. incognitella

Binomial name
- Telphusa incognitella (Walsingham, [1892])

Synonyms
- Gelechia incognitella Walsingham, [1892]; Pseudotelphusa incognitella; Nuntia incognitella

Species of moth

Telphusa incognitella is a moth of the family Gelechiidae. It is found in Japan, Korea and the Russian Far East.

The wingspan is 12–15 mm. The forewings are snow white with black markings.
