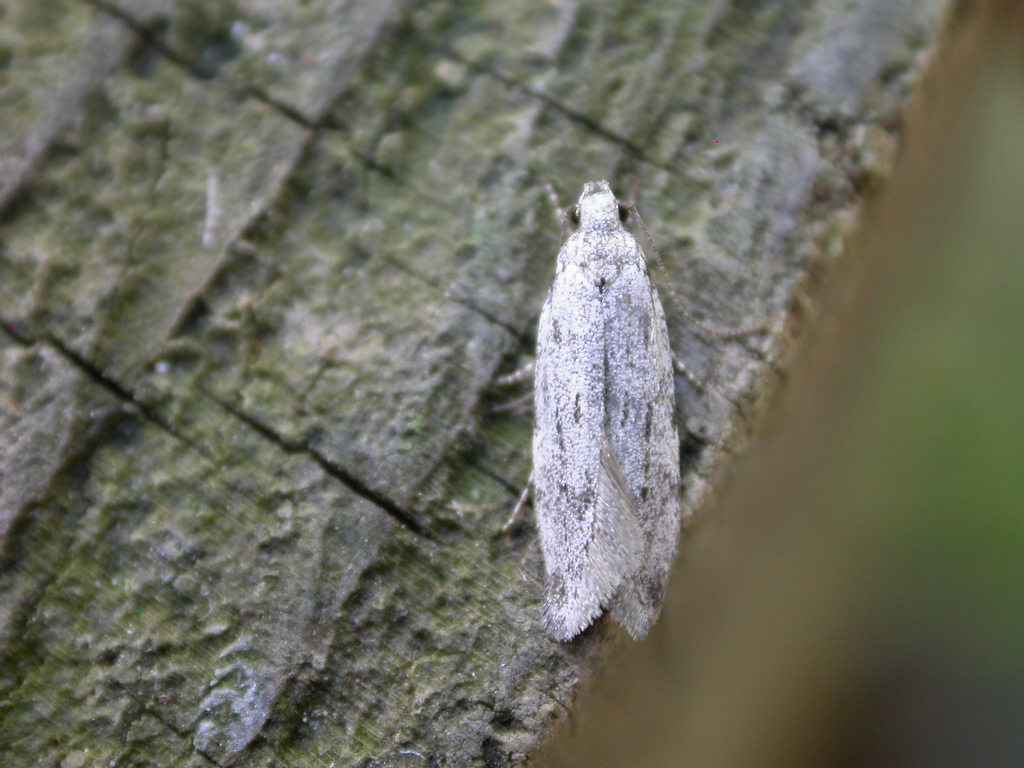

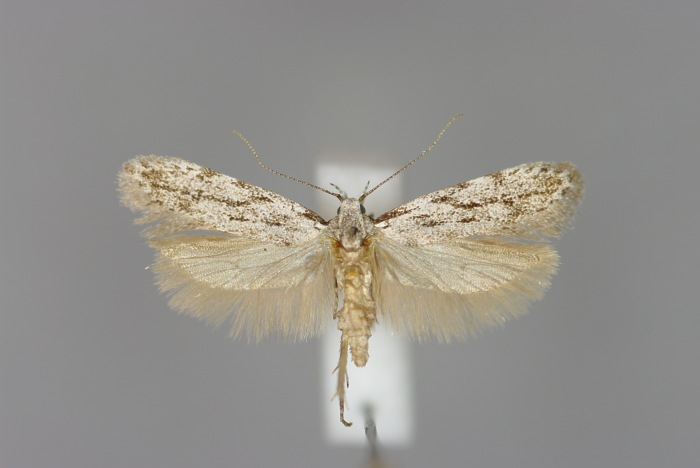

Scientific classification
- Kingdom: Animalia
- Phylum: Arthropoda
- Clade: Pancrustacea
- Class: Insecta
- Order: Lepidoptera
- Family: Gelechiidae
- Genus: Teleiodes
- Species: T. saltuum

Binomial name
- Teleiodes saltuum (Zeller, 1878)

Synonyms
- Gelechia (Teleia) proximella var. saltuum Zeller, 1878; Gelechia nigristrigella Wocke, 1898

= Teleiodes saltuum =

Species of moth

Teleiodes saltuum is a species of moth of the family Gelechiidae. It is found from Norway and Sweden south to France, Italy, Slovenia, Serbia and Montenegro and Romania and from the Netherlands east to Poland.

The wingspan is 15–18 mm.

The larvae feed on Larix species and Pinus sylvestris.
