= Telphusa tetragrapta =

Scientific classification
- Domain: Eukaryota
- Kingdom: Animalia
- Phylum: Arthropoda
- Class: Insecta
- Order: Lepidoptera
- Family: Gelechiidae
- Genus: Telphusa
- Species: T. tetragrapta

Binomial name
- Telphusa tetragrapta Meyrick, 1937

Species of moth

Telphusa tetragrapta is a moth of the family Gelechiidae. It is found in India.

The larvae have been recorded feeding on Quercus incana.
