= Telphusa ripula =

Scientific classification
- Domain: Eukaryota
- Kingdom: Animalia
- Phylum: Arthropoda
- Class: Insecta
- Order: Lepidoptera
- Family: Gelechiidae
- Genus: Telphusa
- Species: T. ripula

Binomial name
- Telphusa ripula Walsingham, 1911

Species of moth

Telphusa ripula is a moth of the family Gelechiidae. It is found in Guatemala.

The wingspan is about 14 mm. The forewings are bronzy brown, mottled with blackish, and partially sprinkled with pale cinereous scales along the costa, and in a line from the base below the fold reaching the dorsum beyond the middle, also in a patch at the tornus. There is a greenish white, outwardly oblique costal streak at about one-fourth from the base, not quite attaining to the dorsum, on either side of it are small patches of raised scales. The median area is blackish and is continued on the outer side of the oblique streak to nearly two-thirds the wing-length, its upper edge forming a zigzag line above the cell, partially outlined by whitish cinereous scales, with a few spots of dark steel-grey along the lower edge of the cell. The apex is much speckled with pale cinereous. The hindwings are brownish grey, more thickly scaled around the margins than towards the middle and base.
