= Telphusa iosticta =

Scientific classification
- Domain: Eukaryota
- Kingdom: Animalia
- Phylum: Arthropoda
- Class: Insecta
- Order: Lepidoptera
- Family: Gelechiidae
- Genus: Telphusa
- Species: T. iosticta

Binomial name
- Telphusa iosticta Meyrick, 1937

Species of moth

Telphusa iosticta is a moth of the family Gelechiidae. It is found in South Africa.
