= Telphusa melanozona =

Scientific classification
- Domain: Eukaryota
- Kingdom: Animalia
- Phylum: Arthropoda
- Class: Insecta
- Order: Lepidoptera
- Family: Gelechiidae
- Genus: Telphusa
- Species: T. melanozona

Binomial name
- Telphusa melanozona Meyrick, 1913

Species of moth

Telphusa melanozona is a moth of the family Gelechiidae. It is found in India (Bengal).

The wingspan is 9–10 mm. The forewings are ochreous-whitish irrorated with light grey and with the base of the costa blackish. There is a moderately broad straight black transverse fascia at one-fourth and a minute black dot in the middle of the disc, as well as two black dots transversely placed in the disc at two-thirds, surrounded with whitish-ochreous, the upper forming the apex of a triangular blackish costal spot. The hindwings are light grey.

The larvae feed on Euphorbia neriifolia. They mine the leaves of their host plant.
