= Telphusa ochrifoliata =

Scientific classification
- Domain: Eukaryota
- Kingdom: Animalia
- Phylum: Arthropoda
- Class: Insecta
- Order: Lepidoptera
- Family: Gelechiidae
- Genus: Telphusa
- Species: T. ochrifoliata

Binomial name
- Telphusa ochrifoliata Walsingham, 1911

Species of moth

Telphusa ochrifoliata is a moth of the family Gelechiidae. It is found in Mexico (Veracruz).

The wingspan is about 14 mm. The forewings are purplish fuscous, blackish at the extreme base and with a large cream-ochreous leaf-like patch, commencing near the base, its upper edge touching the costa, its lower edge resting on the fold, and its outer extremity running to an outwardly pointed angle on the cell about the middle. This patch is narrowly margined, except on the costa, with black, and there are two black dots beyond it, one at each angle of the cell, with a few chestnut-brown scales between them. A pale cream-ochreous spot occurs at the commencement of the costal cilia and a smaller one, containing two black dots, on the termen below the apex. The cilia is fuscous, with some admixture of ochreous scales along the termen. The hindwings are grey, with a slight brownish tinge.
