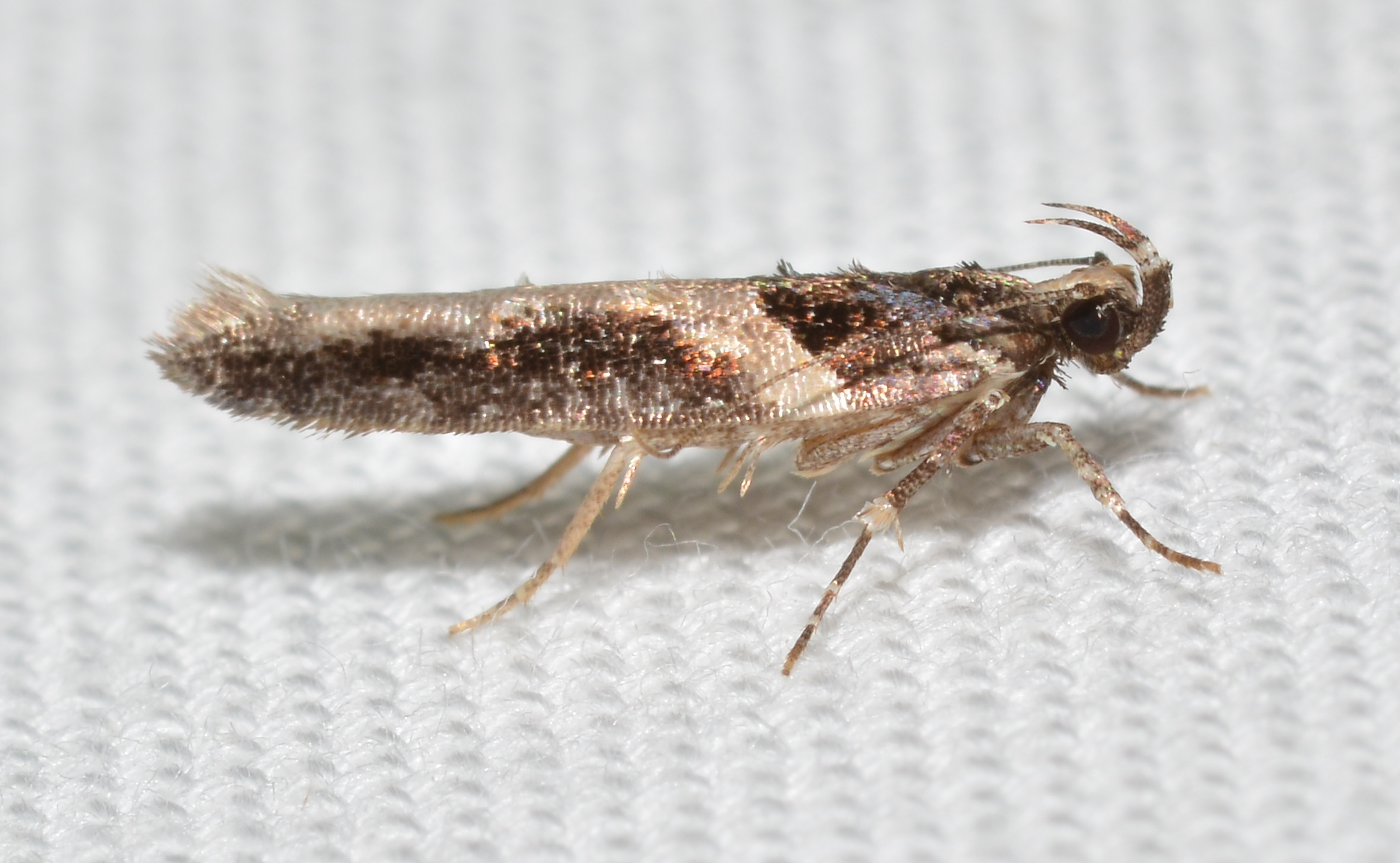

Scientific classification
- Kingdom: Animalia
- Phylum: Arthropoda
- Clade: Pancrustacea
- Class: Insecta
- Order: Lepidoptera
- Family: Gelechiidae
- Genus: Telphusa
- Species: T. longifasciella

Binomial name
- Telphusa longifasciella (Clemens, 1863)

Synonyms
- Gelechia longifasciella Clemens, 1863; Telphusa curvistrigella Chambers, 1872; Gelechia obliquifasciella Chambers, 1880; Gelechia lutraula Meyrick, 1923

= Telphusa longifasciella =

Species of moth

Telphusa longifasciella is a moth of the family Gelechiidae. It is found in North America, where it has been recorded from Alabama, Florida, Illinois, Indiana, Kentucky, Louisiana, Maine, Maryland, Massachusetts, Minnesota, Mississippi, New Brunswick, New Hampshire, New York, Ohio, Ontario, Quebec, South Carolina, Tennessee, Texas, Washington, West Virginia and Wisconsin.

The wingspan is about 18 mm. The forewings are dark purple-fuscous with some white scales at the base and an oblique ochreous-white fascia from one-fourth of the costa to the middle of the dorsum, margined by black suffusion anteriorly, posteriorly continued as a broad irregular whitish streak partially mixed light grey along the dorsum to the middle of the termen, above this a band of black suffusion mixed iridescent crimson-bronzy extending from the fascia to the apex. The hindwings are pale grey.
