= Istrianis wachtlii =

Scientific classification
- Kingdom: Animalia
- Phylum: Arthropoda
- Class: Insecta
- Order: Lepidoptera
- Family: Gelechiidae
- Genus: Istrianis
- Species: I. wachtlii

Binomial name
- Istrianis wachtlii (Rogenhofer, 1881)

Synonyms
- Teleia wachtlii Rogenhofer, 1881; Pseudoteleia wachtlii

Species of moth

Istrianis wachtlii is a moth of the family Gelechiidae. It is found in Egypt, Jordan and south-western Iran.

The wingspan is about 8 mm.

The larvae feed on Tamarix articulata.
