= Telphusa melanoleuca =

Scientific classification
- Domain: Eukaryota
- Kingdom: Animalia
- Phylum: Arthropoda
- Class: Insecta
- Order: Lepidoptera
- Family: Gelechiidae
- Genus: Telphusa
- Species: T. melanoleuca

Binomial name
- Telphusa melanoleuca Walsingham, 1911

Species of moth

Telphusa melanoleuca is a moth of the family Gelechiidae. It is found in Mexico (Guerrero).

The wingspan is about 16 mm. The forewings are brown-black, with an oblique white band leaving the costa at one-fifth, descending obliquely outward to the dorsum at one-fourth, and extending along it to the tornus, before and about which it throws up two angular encroachments upon the dark ground-colour, which almost divides them on the dorsum before the tornus. In this white band, below the middle of the fold, is a shining bottle-green spot, preceded by dark raised scales on the basal patch, with two tufts of white raised scales on either side of the fold, one above the other. Beyond it a third patch of white raised scales lies above the fold, at the first upward angle of the white dorsal band. There is a small white costal streak-spot precedes the cilia and is followed by a series of four, reaching to the apex, below which is another which almost meets the last of the series. The costal and apical cilia, except where interrupted by the white spots, brown-black. The terminal and tornal cilia dirty whitish a bluish green iridescence pervades the part of the dark basal patch and the dark wing-surface about the lower edge of the cell. The hindwings are semitransparent pale cinereous, much shaded with light brown.
