= Telphusa improvida =

Scientific classification
- Domain: Eukaryota
- Kingdom: Animalia
- Phylum: Arthropoda
- Class: Insecta
- Order: Lepidoptera
- Family: Gelechiidae
- Genus: Telphusa
- Species: T. improvida

Binomial name
- Telphusa improvida Meyrick, 1926

Species of moth

Telphusa improvida is a moth of the family Gelechiidae. It is found in southern India.

The wingspan is 8–9 mm. The forewings are grey with sprinkled black scales and elongate suffused black marks on the costa towards the base, about one-third, and a longer one beyond the middle, irregular and variable brownish-ochreous suffusion partially margining these beneath and posteriorly and tending to form three oblique incomplete fasciae and an irregular spot on the end of the cell. The stigmata form irregular black spots, the plical obliquely before the first discal, an additional spot midway between the plical and the base. The hindwings are grey, thinly scaled and pellucid anteriorly.

The larvae feed on Odina wodier. They feed in a cell between overlapping edges of leaves spun flatly together. The frass is ejected through a hole in the underside of the cell. Pupation takes place in a flat cocoon, spun between leaves.
