= Telphusa distictella =

Scientific classification
- Kingdom: Animalia
- Phylum: Arthropoda
- Clade: Pancrustacea
- Class: Insecta
- Order: Lepidoptera
- Family: Gelechiidae
- Genus: Telphusa
- Species: T. distictella

Binomial name
- Telphusa distictella Forbes, 1931

Species of moth

Telphusa distictella is a moth of the family Gelechiidae. It is found in Puerto Rico.
