= Teleiodes kaitilai =

Scientific classification
- Kingdom: Animalia
- Phylum: Arthropoda
- Clade: Pancrustacea
- Class: Insecta
- Order: Lepidoptera
- Family: Gelechiidae
- Genus: Teleiodes
- Species: T. kaitilai

Binomial name
- Teleiodes kaitilai Junnilainen, 2010

Species of moth

Teleiodes kaitilai is a moth of the family Gelechiidae. It is found in Russia (the southern Ural and southern Buryatia). The habitat consists of taiga forests.

The wingspan is 14.5–16.5 mm. Adults are on wing from mid-June to mid-July.

The larvae possibly feed on Larix sibirica.
