= Telphusa nigrifasciata =

Scientific classification
- Domain: Eukaryota
- Kingdom: Animalia
- Phylum: Arthropoda
- Class: Insecta
- Order: Lepidoptera
- Family: Gelechiidae
- Genus: Telphusa
- Species: T. nigrifasciata

Binomial name
- Telphusa nigrifasciata Park, 1992

Species of moth

Telphusa nigrifasciata is a moth of the family Gelechiidae. It is found in South Korea.

The wingspan is 14–17 mm.
