= Telphusa quercicola =

Scientific classification
- Kingdom: Animalia
- Phylum: Arthropoda
- Clade: Pancrustacea
- Class: Insecta
- Order: Lepidoptera
- Family: Gelechiidae
- Genus: Telphusa
- Species: T. quercicola

Binomial name
- Telphusa quercicola Park, 1992

Species of moth

Telphusa quercicola is a moth of the family Gelechiidae. It is found in South Korea.

The wingspan is 12–14 mm.
