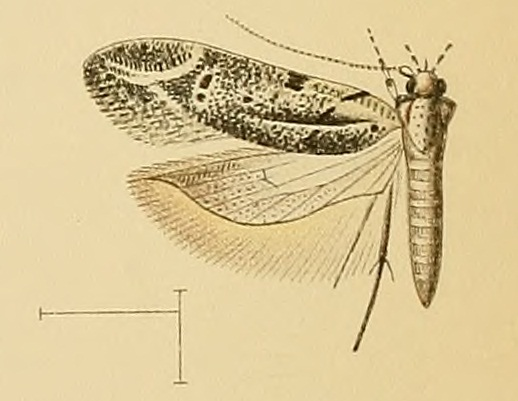

Scientific classification
- Domain: Eukaryota
- Kingdom: Animalia
- Phylum: Arthropoda
- Class: Insecta
- Order: Lepidoptera
- Family: Gelechiidae
- Genus: Streyella
- Species: S. canariensis

Binomial name
- Streyella canariensis (Walsingham, 1908)

Synonyms
- Telphusa canariensis Walsingham, 1908

= Streyella canariensis =

Species of moth

Streyella canariensis is a moth of the family Gelechiidae. It is found on the Canary Islands.

The wingspan is about 16 millimetres (0.63 in). The forewings are mealy white, sprinkled with greyish fuscous. The hindwings are pale grey.
