= Carpatolechia digitilobella =

Scientific classification
- Domain: Eukaryota
- Kingdom: Animalia
- Phylum: Arthropoda
- Class: Insecta
- Order: Lepidoptera
- Family: Gelechiidae
- Genus: Carpatolechia
- Species: C. digitilobella

Binomial name
- Carpatolechia digitilobella (Park, 1992)

Synonyms
- Teleiodes digitilobella Park, 1992

Species of moth

Carpatolechia digitilobella is a moth of the family Gelechiidae. It is found in Korea and Japan.

The wingspan is 12–15 mm (0.5–0.6 in). Adults are on wing from early May to mid-August.
