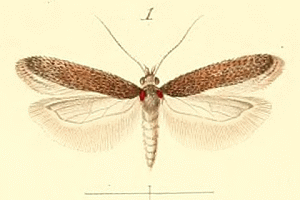

Scientific classification
- Domain: Eukaryota
- Kingdom: Animalia
- Phylum: Arthropoda
- Class: Insecta
- Order: Lepidoptera
- Family: Gelechiidae
- Genus: Telphusa
- Species: T. cistiflorella

Binomial name
- Telphusa cistiflorella (Constant, 1890)

Synonyms
- Lita cistiflorella Constant, 1890

= Telphusa cistiflorella =

Species of moth

Telphusa cistiflorella is a moth of the family Gelechiidae. It is found on the Canary Islands, Sardinia and Crete, as well as in Portugal, Spain, France, Italy and Greece.

The wingspan is 12–15 mm.

The larvae feed on the flowers of Cistus albidus.
