= Teleiodes cyrtocostella =

Scientific classification
- Domain: Eukaryota
- Kingdom: Animalia
- Phylum: Arthropoda
- Class: Insecta
- Order: Lepidoptera
- Family: Gelechiidae
- Genus: Teleiodes
- Species: T. cyrtocostella

Binomial name
- Teleiodes cyrtocostella Park, 1992

Species of moth

Teleiodes cyrtocostella is a moth of the family Gelechiidae. It is found in Korea.

The wingspan is 13.5–15.5 mm. Adults have been recorded on wing in May, suggesting a single generation per year.
