= Telphusa conviciata =

Scientific classification
- Domain: Eukaryota
- Kingdom: Animalia
- Phylum: Arthropoda
- Class: Insecta
- Order: Lepidoptera
- Family: Gelechiidae
- Genus: Telphusa
- Species: T. conviciata

Binomial name
- Telphusa conviciata Meyrick, 1929

Species of moth

Telphusa conviciata is a moth of the family Gelechiidae. It is found in India (Assam).

The wingspan is about 10 mm.
