= Teleiodes klaussattleri =

Scientific classification
- Domain: Eukaryota
- Kingdom: Animalia
- Phylum: Arthropoda
- Class: Insecta
- Order: Lepidoptera
- Family: Gelechiidae
- Genus: Teleiodes
- Species: T. klaussattleri

Binomial name
- Teleiodes klaussattleri Park, 1992

Species of moth

Teleiodes klaussattleri is a moth of the family Gelechiidae. It is found in Korea.

The wingspan is 15–16 mm. Adults are on wing from the end of May to early June.
