= Telphusa translucida =

Scientific classification
- Domain: Eukaryota
- Kingdom: Animalia
- Phylum: Arthropoda
- Class: Insecta
- Order: Lepidoptera
- Family: Gelechiidae
- Genus: Telphusa
- Species: T. translucida

Binomial name
- Telphusa translucida (Walsingham, [1892])

Synonyms
- Bryotropha translucida Walsingham, [1892]; Gelechia translucida

Species of moth

Telphusa translucida is a moth of the family Gelechiidae. It is found in Mexico and the West Indies, where it has been recorded from St. Vincent and Dominica.

The wingspan is 12–14 mm. The forewings are deep brownish fuscous, with the extreme base subochreous and with a broad oblique fascia across the middle of the wing, subochreous mottled with brownish. There are a few subochreous spots about the costal and dorsal margins before the apex. The hindwings are semitransparent, iridescent greyish.
