= Telphusa nephelaspis =

Scientific classification
- Domain: Eukaryota
- Kingdom: Animalia
- Phylum: Arthropoda
- Class: Insecta
- Order: Lepidoptera
- Family: Gelechiidae
- Genus: Telphusa
- Species: T. nephelaspis

Binomial name
- Telphusa nephelaspis Meyrick, 1926

Species of moth

Telphusa nephelaspis is a moth of the family Gelechiidae. It is found in north-western India.

The wingspan is about 13 mm. The forewings are whitish sprinkled with dark grey and with a dark grey rounded patch extending over the dorsum from near the base to the middle and reaching three-fourths of the way across the wing, its upper edge including a blackish raised spot. The first discal stigma forms a very oblique black bar, the second a black dot and there are three irregular dark grey spots before the termen and apex. The hindwings are grey, thinly scaled and translucent in the disc and towards the base.
