= Telphusa obligata =

Scientific classification
- Domain: Eukaryota
- Kingdom: Animalia
- Phylum: Arthropoda
- Class: Insecta
- Order: Lepidoptera
- Family: Gelechiidae
- Genus: Telphusa
- Species: T. obligata

Binomial name
- Telphusa obligata Busck, 1914

Species of moth

Telphusa obligata is a moth of the family Gelechiidae. It is found in Panama.

== Description ==
The wingspan is about 11 mm. The forewings are light ochreous with a strong rosy tint, especially on the costal and apical part and sparsely sprinkled with minute black atoms. At the basal third of the costa is a large, deep black, outwardly oblique spot, reaching beyond the fold and at apical third is a deep black costal spot. There is also a series of small black terminal dots. The base of the dorsum and a small dot on the middle of the wing near the base are black. The hindwings are light fuscous.
