= Telphusa sarcochroma =

Scientific classification
- Kingdom: Animalia
- Phylum: Arthropoda
- Clade: Pancrustacea
- Class: Insecta
- Order: Lepidoptera
- Family: Gelechiidae
- Genus: Telphusa
- Species: T. sarcochroma

Binomial name
- Telphusa sarcochroma (Walsingham, 1900)

Synonyms
- Gelechia sarcochroma Walsingham, 1900; Gelechia hessi Amsel, 1935; Gelechia nigrorosea Walsingham, 1904

Species of moth

Telphusa sarcochroma is a moth of the family Gelechiidae. It is found in Yemen (Socotra), Algeria, Libya, Tunisia, Jordan and Palestine.

The wingspan is about 16 mm. The forewings are whitish flesh-colour, with slight fuscous shading and with four fuscous costal spots, the first at the base, the second at about one-sixth, the third at about the middle and the fourth at the commencement of the costal cilia. There is a broad dorsal streak, arising at one-fifth from the base, terminating at the upper edge of the cell a little beyond the second costal spot, some of the flesh-coloured scales between this and the base are distinctly raised. There are also a few fuscous scales beyond the middle of the cell and one or two in the fold beneath them. The hindwings are shining pale bluish grey.

The larvae feed on Rhus dioica.
