= Telphusa objecta =

Scientific classification
- Domain: Eukaryota
- Kingdom: Animalia
- Phylum: Arthropoda
- Class: Insecta
- Order: Lepidoptera
- Family: Gelechiidae
- Genus: Telphusa
- Species: T. objecta

Binomial name
- Telphusa objecta Meyrick, 1921

Species of moth

Telphusa objecta is a moth of the family Gelechiidae described by Edward Meyrick in 1921. It is found in Zimbabwe.

The wingspan is about 18 mm. The forewings are brown irregularly and suffusedly mixed with dark fuscous, the anterior half irregularly marked with dark fuscous and with an irregular transverse suffused ochreous-whitish blotch from the middle of the costa, almost reaching an irregular triangular ochreous-white blotch on the dorsum opposite. There are irregular ochreous-white opposite spots on the costa at three-fourths and the tornus and there are irregular undefined white marginal dots around the apex. The hindwings are rather dark grey, lighter anteriorly.
