= Istrianis fynbosella =

Scientific classification
- Kingdom: Animalia
- Phylum: Arthropoda
- Clade: Pancrustacea
- Class: Insecta
- Order: Lepidoptera
- Family: Gelechiidae
- Genus: Istrianis
- Species: I. fynbosella

Binomial name
- Istrianis fynbosella Bidzilya & Mey, 2011

Species of moth

Istrianis fynbosella is a moth of the family Gelechiidae. It is found in South Africa.
