= Altenia perspersella =

Scientific classification
- Kingdom: Animalia
- Phylum: Arthropoda
- Clade: Pancrustacea
- Class: Insecta
- Order: Lepidoptera
- Family: Gelechiidae
- Genus: Altenia
- Species: A. perspersella

Binomial name
- Altenia perspersella (Wocke, 1862)

Synonyms
- Gelechia perspersella Wocke, 1862; Teleia empetrella Karvonen, 1932

Species of moth

Altenia perspersella is a moth of the family Gelechiidae. It is found in Norway, Sweden, Finland, Latvia, Lithuania, Russia and Belarus. It was recently discovered in Canada, with records from Manitoba and Yukon.

The wingspan is 12–15 mm (0.47–0.59 in). Adults are on wing from May to July.

The larvae feed on Empetrum nigrum.
