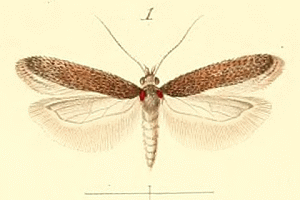
- Telphusa cistiflorella

Scientific classification
- Kingdom: Animalia
- Phylum: Arthropoda
- Class: Insecta
- Order: Lepidoptera
- Family: Gelechiidae
- Tribe: Litini
- Genus: Telphusa; Chambers, 1872

Synonyms
- Adrasteia Chambers, 1872; Adrastia Kirby, [1874]; Geniadophora Walsingham, 1897; Nuntia Omelko, 1995

= Telphusa =

Genus of moths

Telphusa is a genus of moths in the family Gelechiidae.

== Species ==
- Telphusa alexandriacella (Chambers, 1872)
- Telphusa amphichroma Meyrick, 1913
- Telphusa atomatma (Meyrick, 1932)
- Telphusa auxoptila Meyrick, 1926
- Telphusa barygrapta Meyrick, 1932
- Telphusa calathaea Meyrick, 1913
- Telphusa callitechna Meyrick, 1914
- Telphusa chloroderces Meyrick, 1929
- Telphusa cistiflorella (Constant, 1890)
- Telphusa conviciata Meyrick, 1929
- Telphusa delatrix Meyrick, 1923
- Telphusa distictella Forbes, 1931
- Telphusa extranea (Walsingham, [1892])
- Telphusa fasciella (Chambers, 1872)
- Telphusa hemicycla Meyrick, 1932
- Telphusa improvida Meyrick, 1926
- Telphusa incognitella (Caradja, 1920)
- Telphusa iosticta Meyrick, 1937
- Telphusa iriditis Meyrick, 1920
- Telphusa latebricola Meyrick, 1932
- Telphusa longifasciella (Clemens, 1863)
- Telphusa medulella Busck, 1914
- Telphusa melanoleuca Walsingham, 1911
- Telphusa melanozona Meyrick, 1913
- Telphusa melitocyela Meyrick, 1935
- Telphusa microsperma Meyrick, 1920
- Telphusa necromantis Meyrick, 1932
- Telphusa nephelaspis Meyrick, 1926
- Telphusa nephomicta Meyrick, 1932
- Telphusa nigrifasciata Park, 1992
- Telphusa nigrimaculata Braun, 1923
- Telphusa objecta Meyrick, 1921
- Telphusa obligata Busck, 1914
- Telphusa ochrifoliata Walsingham, 1911
- Telphusa orgilopis Meyrick, 1923
- Telphusa penetratrix Meyrick, 1931
- Telphusa perspicua (Walsingham, 1897)
- Telphusa phaulosema Meyrick, 1920
- Telphusa pistaciae Sattler, 1982
- Telphusa prasinoleuca (Meyrick, 1921)
- Telphusa quercicola Park, 1992
- Telphusa quinquedentata (Walsingham, 1911)
- Telphusa retecta Meyrick, 1921
- Telphusa ripula Walsingham, 1911
- Telphusa sarcochroma (Walsingham, 1900)
- Telphusa sedulitella (Busck, 1910)
- Telphusa semiusta Meyrick, 1922
- Telphusa smaragdopis Meyrick, 1926
- Telphusa syncratopa Meyrick, 1935
- Telphusa syndelta Meyrick, 1921
- Telphusa tetragrapta Meyrick, 1937
- Telphusa translucida (Walsingham, [1892])
- Telphusa xyloptera Meyrick, 1932
