= Teleiodes excentricella =

Scientific classification
- Domain: Eukaryota
- Kingdom: Animalia
- Phylum: Arthropoda
- Class: Insecta
- Order: Lepidoptera
- Family: Gelechiidae
- Genus: Teleiodes
- Species: T. excentricella

Binomial name
- Teleiodes excentricella (Turati, 1934)

Synonyms
- Lita excentricella Turati, 1934; Teleiodes paradoxa Piskunov & Emelyanov, 1982

Species of moth

Teleiodes excentricella is a moth of the family Gelechiidae. It is found in Libya, Armenia and Turkmenistan.

The larvae forms galls on the branches of Tamarix species, including Tamarix ramosissima and Tamarix araratica.
