= Teleiodes orientalis =

Scientific classification
- Domain: Eukaryota
- Kingdom: Animalia
- Phylum: Arthropoda
- Class: Insecta
- Order: Lepidoptera
- Family: Gelechiidae
- Genus: Teleiodes
- Species: T. orientalis

Binomial name
- Teleiodes orientalis Park, 1992

Species of moth

Teleiodes orientalis is a moth of the family Gelechiidae. It is found in Korea and Japan.

The wingspan is about 14 mm.
