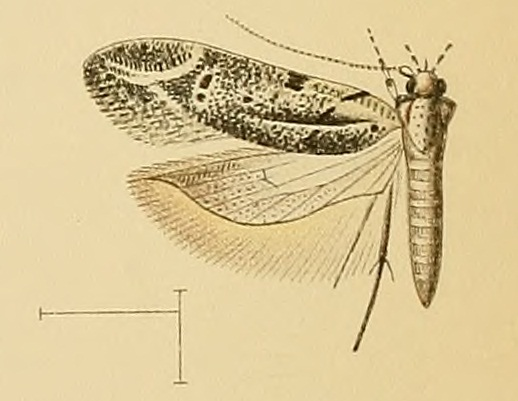
- Streyella canariensis

Scientific classification
- Domain: Eukaryota
- Kingdom: Animalia
- Phylum: Arthropoda
- Class: Insecta
- Order: Lepidoptera
- Family: Gelechiidae
- Tribe: Litini
- Genus: Streyella; Janse, 1958

= Streyella =

Genus of moths

Streyella is a genus of moth in the family Gelechiidae.

== Species ==
- Streyella anguinella (Herrich-Schäffer, 1861)
- Streyella canariensis (Walsingham, 1908)
- Streyella pallidigrisea Janse, 1958
