= Telphusa nephomicta =

Scientific classification
- Domain: Eukaryota
- Kingdom: Animalia
- Phylum: Arthropoda
- Class: Insecta
- Order: Lepidoptera
- Family: Gelechiidae
- Genus: Telphusa
- Species: T. nephomicta

Binomial name
- Telphusa nephomicta Meyrick, 1932

Species of moth

Telphusa nephomicta is a moth of the family Gelechiidae. It is found in South Korea, Japan and China.
