= Carpatolechia yangyangensis =

Scientific classification
- Domain: Eukaryota
- Kingdom: Animalia
- Phylum: Arthropoda
- Class: Insecta
- Order: Lepidoptera
- Family: Gelechiidae
- Genus: Carpatolechia
- Species: C. yangyangensis

Binomial name
- Carpatolechia yangyangensis (Park, 1992)

Synonyms
- Teleiodes yangyangensis Park, 1992

Species of moth

Carpatolechia yangyangensis is a moth of the family Gelechiidae. It is found in Korea, Japan and China (Jilin).

The wingspan is 12–15 mm. Adults are on wing in July, probably in one generation per year.
