= Telphusa pistaciae =

Scientific classification
- Kingdom: Animalia
- Phylum: Arthropoda
- Class: Insecta
- Order: Lepidoptera
- Family: Gelechiidae
- Genus: Telphusa
- Species: T. pistaciae

Binomial name
- Telphusa pistaciae Sattler, 1982

Species of moth

Telphusa pistaciae, the pistachio bud moth, is a moth of the family Gelechiidae. It is found in Iran.

The larvae feed on the blossoms of Pistacia vera.
