= Telphusa chloroderces =

Scientific classification
- Domain: Eukaryota
- Kingdom: Animalia
- Phylum: Arthropoda
- Class: Insecta
- Order: Lepidoptera
- Family: Gelechiidae
- Genus: Telphusa
- Species: T. chloroderces

Binomial name
- Telphusa chloroderces Meyrick, 1929

Species of moth

Telphusa chloroderces is a moth of the family Gelechiidae. It is found in Manchuria.

The wingspan is about 15 mm. The forewings are dark purplish-fuscous. The stigmata form small irregular suffused blackish spots, the plical rather before the first discal, an additional spot on the fold beneath the second discal. The hindwings are light grey.

The larvae feed on Prunus persica. They roll the leaves of their host plant.
