= Telphusa medulella =

Scientific classification
- Domain: Eukaryota
- Kingdom: Animalia
- Phylum: Arthropoda
- Class: Insecta
- Order: Lepidoptera
- Family: Gelechiidae
- Genus: Telphusa
- Species: T. medulella

Binomial name
- Telphusa medulella Busck, 1914

Species of moth

Telphusa medulella is a moth of the family Gelechiidae. It is found in Panama.

The wingspan is about 9 mm. The forewings are ochreous and dark brown in about equal proportion, taking the brown as ground-colour, there is an ill-defined ochreous band from near the base of the costa to the middle of the dorsum and then upward again across the outer part of the cell to the apical third of the costa. This uneven band is loosely connected with an ochreous spot on the apical fourth of the costa by a downwardly curved narrow band and also with a yellow spot at the base of the dorsum, the whole forming a very irregular zigzag band of more or less raised scales on the smooth dark background. At the end of the cell are two deep black dots and on the middle of the fold is a similar, smaller, black dot. The hindwings are light fuscous.
