= Telphusa barygrapta =

Scientific classification
- Kingdom: Animalia
- Phylum: Arthropoda
- Clade: Pancrustacea
- Class: Insecta
- Order: Lepidoptera
- Family: Gelechiidae
- Genus: Telphusa
- Species: T. barygrapta

Binomial name
- Telphusa barygrapta Meyrick, 1932

Synonyms
- Telphusa babygrapta

Species of moth

Telphusa barygrapta is a moth of the family Gelechiidae. It is found in Indonesia (Java).
