= Carpatolechia intermediella =

Scientific classification
- Kingdom: Animalia
- Phylum: Arthropoda
- Clade: Pancrustacea
- Class: Insecta
- Order: Lepidoptera
- Family: Gelechiidae
- Genus: Carpatolechia
- Species: C. intermediella

Binomial name
- Carpatolechia intermediella Huemer & Karsholt, 1999

Species of moth

Carpatolechia intermediella is a moth of the family Gelechiidae. It is found in Spain.
