= Telphusa fasciella =

Scientific classification
- Kingdom: Animalia
- Phylum: Arthropoda
- Clade: Pancrustacea
- Class: Insecta
- Order: Lepidoptera
- Family: Gelechiidae
- Genus: Telphusa
- Species: T. fasciella

Binomial name
- Telphusa fasciella (Chambers, 1872)

Synonyms
- Adrasteia fasciella Chambers, 1872

Species of moth

Telphusa fasciella is a moth of the family Gelechiidae. It is found in North America, where it has been recorded from Kentucky and Maine.

The forewings are pale grey mottled with small dark brown spots, one of which is just within the dorsal margin near the base, another behind the first and on the costal margin, another just within the dorsal margin, about the middle, with a small one near it on the disc, a larger one about the end of the disc, with a small one near it on the costal margin, just behind which is a narrow angulated white fascia indistinct in the middle. There is a small tuft of ochreous scales on each side of the apex of the thorax, a scattered patch of raised scales about the basal fourth of the wing just within the costal margin, another behind it near the dorsal margin, another further back near the costal margin, and a row of scattered raised scales within the dorsal margin.
