= Telphusa delatrix =

Scientific classification
- Domain: Eukaryota
- Kingdom: Animalia
- Phylum: Arthropoda
- Class: Insecta
- Order: Lepidoptera
- Family: Gelechiidae
- Genus: Telphusa
- Species: T. delatrix

Binomial name
- Telphusa delatrix Meyrick, 1923

Species of moth

Telphusa delatrix is a moth of the family Gelechiidae. It is found in Peru.

The wingspan is about 13 mm. The forewings are white with a small black dot on the costa near the base and a narrow very oblique fuscous fascia from the costa towards the base, the black on the costal area and with black raised scales or tufts on the posterior edge, which is prominent near the dorsum. There are semi-oval black spots on the costa at the middle and three-fourths. The second discal stigma is represented by a small black tuft, beneath it a larger dark fuscous tuft, between and beyond these some faint brownish suffusion. There are five small blackish marginal dots around the apex, and some faint brownish suffusion before these. The hindwings are grey.
