= Telphusa smaragdopis =

Scientific classification
- Domain: Eukaryota
- Kingdom: Animalia
- Phylum: Arthropoda
- Class: Insecta
- Order: Lepidoptera
- Family: Gelechiidae
- Genus: Telphusa
- Species: T. smaragdopis

Binomial name
- Telphusa smaragdopis Meyrick, 1926

Species of moth

Telphusa smaragdopis is a moth of the family Gelechiidae. It is found in Costa Rica.

The wingspan is 15–17 mm. The forewings are dark purplish-fuscous with a metallic-green spot resting on the base of the dorsum and an oblique white fascia from the costa at one-fourth to the dorsum, its lower two-thirds occupied, except on the anterior edge, by a metallic-green blotch, and preceded by a triangular blackish dorsal blotch of rough scales. Black spots represent the stigmata, with some tufts of scales, or these are merged in a discal patch of black suffusion, beneath this a grey-whitish dorsal streak from the fascia to near the tornus, marked with a metallic-green subdorsal spot beneath the middle of the wing, and another towards the tornus with some metallic-green discal irroration above it. There is a short outwards-oblique black streak from the tornus, beneath its apex some metallic-green suffusion. The posterior part of the costa and termen are dotted with ochreous-whitish irroration. The hindwings are grey, becoming subhyaline on the basal half, with the veins dark grey.
