= Teleiodes murina =

Scientific classification
- Domain: Eukaryota
- Kingdom: Animalia
- Phylum: Arthropoda
- Class: Insecta
- Order: Lepidoptera
- Family: Gelechiidae
- Genus: Teleiodes
- Species: T. murina

Binomial name
- Teleiodes murina (Omelko & Omelko, 1998)

Synonyms
- Dubitationis murina Omelko & Omelko, 1998

Species of moth

Teleiodes murina is a moth of the family Gelechiidae. It is found in Korea and the Russian Far East.
