= Telphusa hemicycla =

Scientific classification
- Domain: Eukaryota
- Kingdom: Animalia
- Phylum: Arthropoda
- Class: Insecta
- Order: Lepidoptera
- Family: Gelechiidae
- Genus: Telphusa
- Species: T. hemicycla

Binomial name
- Telphusa hemicycla Meyrick, 1932

Species of moth

Telphusa hemicycla is a moth of the family Gelechiidae. It is found in Paraguay.
