= Teleiodes albiluculella =

Scientific classification
- Kingdom: Animalia
- Phylum: Arthropoda
- Clade: Pancrustacea
- Class: Insecta
- Order: Lepidoptera
- Family: Gelechiidae
- Genus: Teleiodes
- Species: T. albiluculella

Binomial name
- Teleiodes albiluculella Huemer & Karsholt, 2001

Species of moth

Teleiodes albiluculella is a moth of the family Gelechiidae. It is found on Crete.

The wingspan is 9–11 mm. Adults have been recorded on wing in late June.
