= Carpatolechia daehania =

Scientific classification
- Domain: Eukaryota
- Kingdom: Animalia
- Phylum: Arthropoda
- Class: Insecta
- Order: Lepidoptera
- Family: Gelechiidae
- Genus: Carpatolechia
- Species: C. daehania

Binomial name
- Carpatolechia daehania (Park, 1993)

Synonyms
- Pseudotelphusa daehania Park, 1993

Species of moth

Carpatolechia daehania is a moth of the family Gelechiidae. It is found in South Korea and Japan.

The wingspan is 11.5–13 mm.
