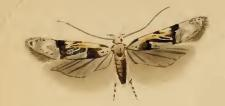

Scientific classification
- Kingdom: Animalia
- Phylum: Arthropoda
- Clade: Pancrustacea
- Class: Insecta
- Order: Lepidoptera
- Family: Gelechiidae
- Genus: Altenia
- Species: A. scriptella

Binomial name
- Altenia scriptella (Hübner, 1796)

Synonyms
- Tinea scriptella Hubner, 1796

= Altenia scriptella =

Species of moth

Altenia scriptella is a moth of the family Gelechiidae. It is found from most of Europe, to the Volga region, Turkey and the Caucasus.

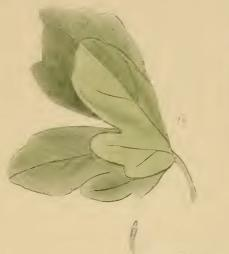
A folded maple leaf

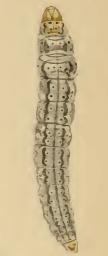
Larva

The wingspan is 10–15 mm. Adults are on wing from June to July in one generation per year.

The larvae feed on Acer campestris, Acer pseudoplatanus and Acer platanoides. They in a folded leaf of their host plant. The species overwinters in the pupal stage.
