= Telphusa latebricola =

Scientific classification
- Domain: Eukaryota
- Kingdom: Animalia
- Phylum: Arthropoda
- Class: Insecta
- Order: Lepidoptera
- Family: Gelechiidae
- Genus: Telphusa
- Species: T. latebricola

Binomial name
- Telphusa latebricola Meyrick, 1932

Species of moth

Telphusa latebricola is a moth of the family Gelechiidae. It is found on the British Virgin Islands (Thatch island).
