= Teleiodes paraluculella =

Scientific classification
- Domain: Eukaryota
- Kingdom: Animalia
- Phylum: Arthropoda
- Class: Insecta
- Order: Lepidoptera
- Family: Gelechiidae
- Genus: Teleiodes
- Species: T. paraluculella

Binomial name
- Teleiodes paraluculella Park, 1992

Species of moth

Teleiodes paraluculella is a moth of the family Gelechiidae. It is found in Korea.

The wingspan is about 10 mm. The forewings are greyish. The hindwings are pale grey.
