= Teleiodes flavipunctatella =

Scientific classification
- Domain: Eukaryota
- Kingdom: Animalia
- Phylum: Arthropoda
- Class: Insecta
- Order: Lepidoptera
- Family: Gelechiidae
- Genus: Teleiodes
- Species: T. flavipunctatella

Binomial name
- Teleiodes flavipunctatella Park, 1992

Species of moth

Teleiodes flavipunctatella is a moth of the family Gelechiidae. It is found in Korea.

The wingspan is 11–15 mm. Adults are on wing from mid-May to mid-August.
