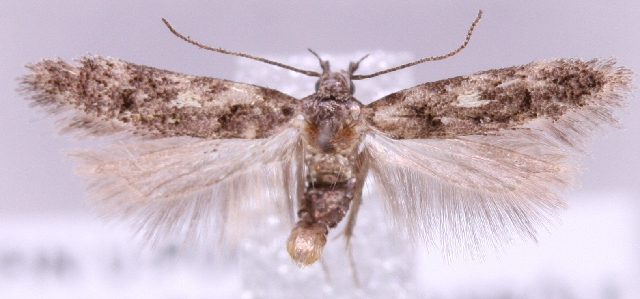

Scientific classification
- Kingdom: Animalia
- Phylum: Arthropoda
- Class: Insecta
- Order: Lepidoptera
- Family: Gelechiidae
- Genus: Teleiodes
- Species: T. flavimaculella

Binomial name
- Teleiodes flavimaculella (Herrich-Schäffer, 1854)

Synonyms
- Gelechia luculella [var.] flavimaculella Herrich-Schäffer, 1854; Teleiodes luculella var. rufipunctella Steudel, 1882; Gelechia (Teleia) luculella ab. dealbella Klemensiewicz, 1902; Telphusa luculella f. herrichi Dufrane, 1955

= Teleiodes flavimaculella =

Species of moth

Teleiodes flavimaculella, the chestnut groundling, is a moth of the family Gelechiidae. It is widely but locally distributed in Europe (except the northernmost and southernmost parts), east to Siberia.

The wingspan is 9–13 mm. Adults are on wing from May to July in one generation per year.

The larvae possibly feed on Castanea sativa and Quercus.
