= Telphusa perspicua =

Scientific classification
- Domain: Eukaryota
- Kingdom: Animalia
- Phylum: Arthropoda
- Class: Insecta
- Order: Lepidoptera
- Family: Gelechiidae
- Genus: Telphusa
- Species: T. perspicua

Binomial name
- Telphusa perspicua (Walsingham, 1897)

Synonyms
- Gelechia perspicua Walsingham, 1897

Species of moth

Telphusa perspicua is a moth of the family Gelechiidae. It is found in the West Indies, where it has been recorded from Hispaniola, Cuba and Puerto Rico.

The wingspan is about 13 mm. The forewings are dark brown, much mottled with whitish ochreous, mingled with iridescent green reflections. The paler colouring does not extend to the base but only to the sinuate oblique outer edge of a strongly-marked dark basal patch, the green metallic reflections being especially noticeable beyond its outer margin. Below the middle of the costal margin is a small ocelloid spot with a dark brown centre, and the pale upper margin is preceded by a smaller one and followed by a third spot a little more distant from it, which forms the outer extremity of a dark brown shade. There are three patches of raised whitish-ochreous scales, the first on the disc before the middle, and two below the disc almost reaching the dorsum, the one before the other behind the middle. The apical portion of the wing is much mottled and contains a paler costal patch at one-fourth from the apex. The hindwings are very transparent, the veins indicated by greyish brown, the intermediate spaces except at the apex with bright steel-blue iridescence.
