= Telphusa penetratrix =

Scientific classification
- Domain: Eukaryota
- Kingdom: Animalia
- Phylum: Arthropoda
- Class: Insecta
- Order: Lepidoptera
- Family: Gelechiidae
- Genus: Telphusa
- Species: T. penetratrix

Binomial name
- Telphusa penetratrix Meyrick, 1931

Species of moth

Telphusa penetratrix is a moth of the family Gelechiidae. It is found in Paraguay.
