= Telphusa phaulosema =

Scientific classification
- Domain: Eukaryota
- Kingdom: Animalia
- Phylum: Arthropoda
- Class: Insecta
- Order: Lepidoptera
- Family: Gelechiidae
- Genus: Telphusa
- Species: T. phaulosema

Binomial name
- Telphusa phaulosema Meyrick, 1920

Species of moth

Telphusa phaulosema is a moth of the family Gelechiidae. It is found in Kenya.
