= Teleiodes bradleyi =

Scientific classification
- Domain: Eukaryota
- Kingdom: Animalia
- Phylum: Arthropoda
- Class: Insecta
- Order: Lepidoptera
- Family: Gelechiidae
- Genus: Teleiodes
- Species: T. bradleyi

Binomial name
- Teleiodes bradleyi Park, 1992

Species of moth

Teleiodes bradleyi is a moth of the family Gelechiidae. It is found in Korea.

The wingspan is 13–14 mm.
