= Istrianis steganotricha =

Scientific classification
- Kingdom: Animalia
- Phylum: Arthropoda
- Class: Insecta
- Order: Lepidoptera
- Family: Gelechiidae
- Genus: Istrianis
- Species: I. steganotricha

Binomial name
- Istrianis steganotricha (Meyrick, 1935)

Synonyms
- Telphusa steganotricha Meyrick, 1935

Species of moth

Istrianis steganotricha is a moth of the family Gelechiidae. It is found in India and Indonesia (Java).

The larvae feed on Desmodium species.
