= Telphusa extranea =

Scientific classification
- Domain: Eukaryota
- Kingdom: Animalia
- Phylum: Arthropoda
- Class: Insecta
- Order: Lepidoptera
- Family: Gelechiidae
- Genus: Telphusa
- Species: T. extranea

Binomial name
- Telphusa extranea (Walsingham, [1892])

Synonyms
- Poecilia extranea Walsingham, [1892]; Geniadophora extranea

Species of moth

Telphusa extranea is a moth of the family Gelechiidae. It is found in the West Indies, where it has been recorded from St. Vincent.

The wingspan is about 10 mm. The forewings are brownish fuscous at the base for one third their length, cinereous speckled with brownish fuscous beyond, much shaded with brownish fuscous on the apical fourth. There is a slender white line commencing at the base and following the costal margin, which is bent downwards and forms a sinuous outer edge to the basal patch, reaching the dorsal margin obliquely before the middle. Another slender white line which commences below the middle of the costa is sinuated outwards and downwards to the anterior edge of the dark apical fourth, where it meets a shorter, slender white line, which reverts obliquely to the dorsal margin. Along the extreme apical margin is a narrow whitish line enclosing a short series of black dots. The hindwings are grey.
