= Telphusa xyloptera =

Scientific classification
- Domain: Eukaryota
- Kingdom: Animalia
- Phylum: Arthropoda
- Class: Insecta
- Order: Lepidoptera
- Family: Gelechiidae
- Genus: Telphusa
- Species: T. xyloptera

Binomial name
- Telphusa xyloptera Meyrick, 1932

Species of moth

Telphusa xyloptera is a moth of the family Gelechiidae first described by Edward Meyrick in 1932. It is found in Uganda.
