= Telphusa nigrimaculata =

Scientific classification
- Kingdom: Animalia
- Phylum: Arthropoda
- Class: Insecta
- Order: Lepidoptera
- Family: Gelechiidae
- Genus: Telphusa
- Species: T. nigrimaculata

Binomial name
- Telphusa nigrimaculata Braun, 1923

Species of moth

Telphusa nigrimaculata is a moth of the family Gelechiidae. It is found in North America, where it has been recorded from California.

The wingspan is about 12 mm. The forewings are dull ocherous with fuscous dusting and small aggregates of raised black scales forming ill-defined markings. An oblique line of minute black spots forms the inner border of an almost undusted bar, which extends from the basal fifth of the costa to the fold. Beyond this paler area, in the dusted middle portion of the wing, are several small patches of black scales. Near the end of the fold is a minute patch of raised black scales, and above the end of the fold, a larger patch of raised scales is found. There is also an elongated patch of denser dusting in the middle of the coastal margin. Around the apex, the dusting is arranged in spots separated by the undusted ground color. The hindwings are brownish ocherous.
