= Altenia elsneriella =

Scientific classification
- Kingdom: Animalia
- Phylum: Arthropoda
- Clade: Pancrustacea
- Class: Insecta
- Order: Lepidoptera
- Family: Gelechiidae
- Genus: Altenia
- Species: A. elsneriella

Binomial name
- Altenia elsneriella Huemer & Karsholt, 1999

Species of moth

Altenia elsneriella is a moth of the family Gelechiidae. It is found in Croatia, North Macedonia and Greece.
