= Telphusa auxoptila =

Scientific classification
- Domain: Eukaryota
- Kingdom: Animalia
- Phylum: Arthropoda
- Class: Insecta
- Order: Lepidoptera
- Family: Gelechiidae
- Genus: Telphusa
- Species: T. auxoptila

Binomial name
- Telphusa auxoptila Meyrick, 1926

Synonyms
- Recurvaria auxoptila

Species of moth

Telphusa auxoptila is a moth of the family Gelechiidae. It is found in Colombia.

The wingspan is about 20 mm. The forewings are light brownish-ochreous and a broad suffused white streak attenuated to extremities along the costa from near the base to near the apex. The dorsal half is tinged whitish on the posterior half of the wing. There is a large blackish tuft beneath the fold at one-third of the wing and a small blackish tuft on the fold before the middle, a whitish tuft about this, and a whitish tuft on the end of the cell edged beneath by a black dot. There are two indistinct elongate blackish dots on the upper part of the termen. The hindwings are ochreous-whitish.
