= Telphusa microsperma =

Scientific classification
- Kingdom: Animalia
- Phylum: Arthropoda
- Class: Insecta
- Order: Lepidoptera
- Family: Gelechiidae
- Genus: Telphusa
- Species: T. microsperma

Binomial name
- Telphusa microsperma Meyrick, 1920

Species of moth

Telphusa microsperma is a moth of the family Gelechiidae. It is found in Kenya.
