= Teleiodes qinghaiensis =

Scientific classification
- Domain: Eukaryota
- Kingdom: Animalia
- Phylum: Arthropoda
- Class: Insecta
- Order: Lepidoptera
- Family: Gelechiidae
- Genus: Teleiodes
- Species: T. qinghaiensis

Binomial name
- Teleiodes qinghaiensis Li, 1999

Species of moth

Teleiodes qinghaiensis is a moth of the family Gelechiidae. It is found in China.
