= Telphusa prasinoleuca =

Scientific classification
- Domain: Eukaryota
- Kingdom: Animalia
- Phylum: Arthropoda
- Class: Insecta
- Order: Lepidoptera
- Family: Gelechiidae
- Genus: Telphusa
- Species: T. prasinoleuca

Binomial name
- Telphusa prasinoleuca (Meyrick, 1921)

Synonyms
- Gelechia prasinoleuca Meyrick, 1921

Species of moth

Telphusa prasinoleuca is a moth of the family Gelechiidae. It is found in Indonesia (Java).

The wingspan is about 13 mm. The forewings are white, somewhat speckled with grey towards the margins, the disc suffused with light green. There are two black marks on the basal portion of the costa and one on the base of the dorsum, as well as a black dot in the disc at one-fourth and an oblique black fasciate streak from one-third of the costa to the fold, with a subdorsal tuft of raised scales beneath this. There is also a small black spot on the middle of the costa and an inwards-oblique black blotch on the costa at two-thirds, reaching half across the wing. The hindwings are whitish, the posterior half suffused with light grey.
