= Telphusa orgilopis =

Scientific classification
- Domain: Eukaryota
- Kingdom: Animalia
- Phylum: Arthropoda
- Class: Insecta
- Order: Lepidoptera
- Family: Gelechiidae
- Genus: Telphusa
- Species: T. orgilopis

Binomial name
- Telphusa orgilopis Meyrick, 1923

Species of moth

Telphusa orgilopis is a moth of the family Gelechiidae. It is found in Brazil (Para).

The wingspan is about 12 mm. The forewings are pinkish-whitish irregularly suffused light grey and with four undefined blackish transverse fasciae, the first near the base, including two large ochreous-brown tufts, the second mixed ochreous-brown, with a large submedian tuft, the third connected with the second by irregular dark grey and brownish suffusion in the disc, and containing two large tufts. There are white spots on the costa beyond the second and third, the space between the third and fourth chestnut-brown, cut by a very acute blackish median projection from the third. The fourth is found near the apex, accompanied by a small blackish apical spot. The hindwings are dark grey.
