= Istrianis =

Scientific classification
- Kingdom: Animalia
- Phylum: Arthropoda
- Clade: Pancrustacea
- Class: Insecta
- Order: Lepidoptera
- Family: Gelechiidae
- Subfamily: Gelechiinae
- Tribe: Litini
- Genus: Istrianis; Meyrick, 1918

Synonyms
- Pseudoteleia Amsel, 1935

Genus of moths

Istrianis is a genus of moths in the family Gelechiidae.

== Species ==
- Istrianis brucinella (Mann, 1872)
- Istrianis crauropa Meyrick, 1918
- Istrianis femoralis (Staudinger, 1876)
- Istrianis fynbosella Bidzilya & Mey, 2011
- Istrianis myricariella (Frey, 1870)
- Istrianis nigrosquamella (Amsel, 1959)
- Istrianis squamodorella (Amsel, 1935)
- Istrianis steganotricha (Meyrick, 1935)
- Istrianis wachtlii (Rogenhofer, 1881)
