= Istrianis crauropa =

Scientific classification
- Kingdom: Animalia
- Phylum: Arthropoda
- Class: Insecta
- Order: Lepidoptera
- Family: Gelechiidae
- Genus: Istrianis
- Species: I. crauropa

Binomial name
- Istrianis crauropa Meyrick, 1918

Species of moth

Istrianis crauropa is a moth of the family Gelechiidae. It is found in southern India.

The wingspan is about 6 mm. The forewings are dark grey, sprinkled whitish and with undefined elongate spots of blackish irroration on the costa at one-fifth, two-fifths, and three-fifths, separated and last followed by small suffused whitish spots. There is a black subbasal dot on the dorsum surrounded by ochreous-brownish suffusion and there is an oblique black bar in the disc at one-fourth, surrounded by ochreous-brown. Several ochreous-brown tufts are found in the disc and there is some irregular ochreous-brown suffusion, as well as small blackish dots posteriorly. The hindwings are pale grey.

The larvae feed on the leaves of Butea frondosa. Pupation takes place in a spindle shaped cocoon made on the leaf.
