= Carpatolechia deogyusanae =

Scientific classification
- Domain: Eukaryota
- Kingdom: Animalia
- Phylum: Arthropoda
- Class: Insecta
- Order: Lepidoptera
- Family: Gelechiidae
- Genus: Carpatolechia
- Species: C. deogyusanae

Binomial name
- Carpatolechia deogyusanae (Park, 1992)

Synonyms
- Teleiodes deogyusanae Park, 1992

Species of moth

Carpatolechia deogyusanae is a moth of the family Gelechiidae. It is found in South Korea.

The wingspan is 9-12.5 mm.

The larvae feed on Quercus species.
