= Altenia wagneriella =

Scientific classification
- Domain: Eukaryota
- Kingdom: Animalia
- Phylum: Arthropoda
- Class: Insecta
- Order: Lepidoptera
- Family: Gelechiidae
- Genus: Altenia
- Species: A. wagneriella

Binomial name
- Altenia wagneriella (Rebel, 1926)

Synonyms
- Gelechia wagneriella Rebel, 1926; Telphusa wagneriella; Klaussattleria danilevskyi Piskunov, 1973

Species of moth

Altenia wagneriella is a moth of the family Gelechiidae. It is found in Croatia, North Macedonia, Greece, Serbia and on Cyprus. It is also present in Turkey, Iran, Tajikistan and Turkmenistan.
