= Telphusa amphichroma =

Scientific classification
- Domain: Eukaryota
- Kingdom: Animalia
- Phylum: Arthropoda
- Class: Insecta
- Order: Lepidoptera
- Family: Gelechiidae
- Genus: Telphusa
- Species: T. amphichroma

Binomial name
- Telphusa amphichroma Meyrick, 1913

Species of moth

Telphusa amphichroma is a moth of the family Gelechiidae first described by Edward Meyrick in 1913. It is found in South Africa.

The wingspan is about 13 mm. The forewings are grey sprinkled with whitish and with an ochreous-brownish streak along the costa from the base, on the median third becoming an irregular patch reaching halfway across the wing, the apical third represented by some indefinite brownish suffusion. There is a blackish-grey patch occupying the basal two-fifths of the dorsum and reaching halfway across the wing, where a dark grey streak extends along the dorsum to the tornus, its posterior portion enlarged as an irregular patch to meet the costal ochreous-brown patch, and terminated by some raised blackish scales. The plical and first discal stigmata are cloudy, blackish, the plical slightly anterior, resting on the edge of the dorsal streak, the first discal on the edge of the costal patch. The hindwings are grey, paler and thinly scaled anteriorly.
