= Telphusa sedulitella =

Scientific classification
- Domain: Eukaryota
- Kingdom: Animalia
- Phylum: Arthropoda
- Class: Insecta
- Order: Lepidoptera
- Family: Gelechiidae
- Genus: Telphusa
- Species: T. sedulitella

Binomial name
- Telphusa sedulitella (Busck, 1910)

Synonyms
- Gelechia sedulitella Busck, 1910; Telphusa agrifolia Braun, 1921

Species of moth

Telphusa sedulitella is a moth of the family Gelechiidae. It is found in North America, where it has been recorded from Arizona, British Columbia, California, Oregon and Washington. In the south, the range extends to Baja California.

The wingspan is 13–14 mm. The forewings are dark brown, mottled with lighter brown, black and white. The basal third is unmottled, rather darker than the rest of the wing and limited by a narrow indistinct blackish oblique streak across the wing. A series of five tufts of raised scales runs parallel with the dorsal edge. Beyond the last of these tufts, which contains some white scales, is a thin oblique pure white line from the tornus towards the apex. The apical part are rather freely dusted with white. The hindwings are light bluish fuscous, darker towards the edges.

The larvae have been reported feeding on Quercus (including Quercus agrifolia), Salix and Corylus species.
