= Telphusa syndelta =

Scientific classification
- Domain: Eukaryota
- Kingdom: Animalia
- Phylum: Arthropoda
- Class: Insecta
- Order: Lepidoptera
- Family: Gelechiidae
- Genus: Telphusa
- Species: T. syndelta

Binomial name
- Telphusa syndelta Meyrick, 1921

Synonyms
- Nothris deltocrates Meyrick, 1927

Species of moth

Telphusa syndelta is a moth of the family Gelechiidae first described by Edward Meyrick in 1921. It is found in Zimbabwe.

The wingspan is about 12 mm. The forewings are ochreous white and the markings black, with a slight purplish tinge. There are two large triangular dorsal blotches, connected on the dorsum, occupying the whole dorsum except the base, the first reaching two-thirds of the way across the wing and just touching a triangular spot on the costa at one-fourth, the second reaching more than halfway across the wing. There is a semi-oval spot on the costa beyond the middle, a minute strigula before this, and a very small spot at three-fourths, as well as an oblong blotch extending along the termen to the costa and just touching the second dorsal blotch at the tornus. The hindwings are grey, thinly scaled and subhyaline (almost glass like) anteriorly, darker suffused towards the termen.
