= Telphusa iriditis =

Scientific classification
- Domain: Eukaryota
- Kingdom: Animalia
- Phylum: Arthropoda
- Class: Insecta
- Order: Lepidoptera
- Family: Gelechiidae
- Genus: Telphusa
- Species: T. iriditis

Binomial name
- Telphusa iriditis Meyrick, 1920

Species of moth

Telphusa iriditis is a moth of the family Gelechiidae. It is found in Namibia.

The wingspan is about 12 mm. The forewings are purplish-grey speckled with black, with iridescent green reflections and with three small spots of black irroration on the costa at one-sixth, one-third, and the middle, each with a small brownish-ochreous spot adjacent beneath, some whitish irroration between these extending obliquely towards the disc. There is a black oblique mark in the disc beneath the first of these, and a black longitudinal spot beneath the second. Three small brownish-ochreous tufts are found towards the dorsum from one-third to before the tornus and there is a small brownish-ochreous spot in the middle of the disc and another at two-thirds. There is also a transverse black spot in the disc towards the apex, preceded by two brownish-ochreous dots transversely placed. Three brownish-ochreous dots are found on the costa and two on the termen towards the apex, separated with black and with a more distinct small black spot at the apex. The hindwings are light grey thinly scaled towards the base, with the margins and veins suffused with darker grey.
