= Telphusa alexandriacella =

Scientific classification
- Kingdom: Animalia
- Phylum: Arthropoda
- Class: Insecta
- Order: Lepidoptera
- Family: Gelechiidae
- Genus: Telphusa
- Species: T. alexandriacella

Binomial name
- Telphusa alexandriacella (Chambers, 1872)

Synonyms
- Adrasteia alexandriacella Chambers, 1872

Species of moth

Telphusa alexandriacella is a moth of the family Gelechiidae. It is found in North America, where it has been recorded from Kentucky.

The forewings are grey, mottled with dark brown spots and with a few small white spots. An irregular white fascia, angulated in the middle towards the apex, crosses the wing at the beginning of the cilia. The apex is dark brown, with a row of small white spots around the base of the cilia, which themselves are pale luteous, dusted with dark brown. The hindwings pale fuscous.
