= Telphusa quinquedentata =

Scientific classification
- Domain: Eukaryota
- Kingdom: Animalia
- Phylum: Arthropoda
- Class: Insecta
- Order: Lepidoptera
- Family: Gelechiidae
- Genus: Telphusa
- Species: T. quinquedentata

Binomial name
- Telphusa quinquedentata (Walsingham, 1911)

Synonyms
- Gelechia quinquedentata Walsingham, 1911

Species of moth

Telphusa quinquedentata is a moth of the family Gelechiidae. It is found in Mexico (Guerrero).

The wingspan is about 16 mm. The forewings are stone-grey, dusted and spotted with greyish fuscous and with four or five spots on the basal third, one at the extreme base of the costa, one on the dorsum at one-fourth, the first margined beneath by whitish scaling. A spot is found at the end of the cell, and one below and beyond it above the extremity of the fold. There are five tooth-like costal spots before the apex, with whitish scaling between them, and a whitish mark below them pointing to the apex. The hindwings are brownish grey.
