= Telphusa retecta =

Scientific classification
- Kingdom: Animalia
- Phylum: Arthropoda
- Clade: Pancrustacea
- Class: Insecta
- Order: Lepidoptera
- Family: Gelechiidae
- Genus: Telphusa
- Species: T. retecta

Binomial name
- Telphusa retecta Meyrick, 1921

Species of moth

Telphusa retecta is a moth of the family Gelechiidae first described by Edward Meyrick in 1921. It is found in South Africa.

The wingspan is about 14 millimetres (0.55 in). The forewings are dark grey, slightly and irregularly speckled with whitish and with small blackish spots at and near the base on the costa, as well as a small white spot on the base of the dorsum, followed by an irregular semi-oval blackish blotch extending to about the middle of the dorsum, posteriorly suffused, and reaching more than halfway across the wing. A longitudinal streak of light brownish suffusion is found above this blotch and there is a blackish elongate mark on the costa before the middle, as well as a blackish oblique streak beneath this reaching to the middle of the wing, the extremity representing the first discal stigma, the plical stigma black, beneath this, edged posteriorly with whitish. The second discal stigma is black, edged laterally with whitish and forms the apex of a dark fuscous elongate-triangular blotch from the costa above it. The posterior part of the costa and upper part of the termen are obscurely spotted with whitish sprinkles, dark fuscous between the spots. The hindwings are grey, thinly scaled and pale in the disc anteriorly.
