= Teleiodes gangwonensis =

Scientific classification
- Kingdom: Animalia
- Phylum: Arthropoda
- Class: Insecta
- Order: Lepidoptera
- Family: Gelechiidae
- Genus: Teleiodes
- Species: T. gangwonensis

Binomial name
- Teleiodes gangwonensis Park & Ponomarenko, 2007

Species of moth

Teleiodes gangwonensis is a moth of the family Gelechiidae. It is found in central Korea.

The wingspan is 10–10.5 mm.

== Etymology ==
The species name refers to Gangwon, the locality.
