= Streyella pallidigrisea =

Scientific classification
- Domain: Eukaryota
- Kingdom: Animalia
- Phylum: Arthropoda
- Class: Insecta
- Order: Lepidoptera
- Family: Gelechiidae
- Genus: Streyella
- Species: S. pallidigrisea

Binomial name
- Streyella pallidigrisea Janse, 1958

Species of moth

Streyella pallidigrisea is a moth of the family Gelechiidae. It is found in Namibia.
