= Telphusa calathaea =

Scientific classification
- Domain: Eukaryota
- Kingdom: Animalia
- Phylum: Arthropoda
- Class: Insecta
- Order: Lepidoptera
- Family: Gelechiidae
- Genus: Telphusa
- Species: T. calathaea

Binomial name
- Telphusa calathaea Meyrick, 1913

Species of moth

Telphusa calathaea is a moth of the family Gelechiidae first described by Edward Meyrick in 1913. It is found in South Africa.

The wingspan is about 15 mm. The forewings are pale brownish, finely whitish sprinkled, with a few scattered blackish scales and with two small confluent black spots on the base of the costa, the costal edge is blackish to the antemedian patch. There are irregular sub-triangular blackish patches on the costa before and beyond the middle, the first reaching to beyond the fold, the second not reaching halfway across the wing. There is a raised transverse mark of a few blackish scales representing the second discal stigma and the apical area is suffused with grey, mixed with blackish scales, intersected by an obscure pale curved shade from three-fourths of the costa to the tornus. The hindwings are grey, paler and thinly scaled towards the base.
