= Streyella anguinella =

Scientific classification
- Domain: Eukaryota
- Kingdom: Animalia
- Phylum: Arthropoda
- Class: Insecta
- Order: Lepidoptera
- Family: Gelechiidae
- Genus: Streyella
- Species: S. anguinella

Binomial name
- Streyella anguinella (Herrich-Schäffer, 1861)

Synonyms
- Gelechia anguinella Herrich-Schäffer, 1861; Teleiodes anguinella; Telphusa ostentella Zerny, 1934; Teleiodes ostentella; Streyella ostentella

Species of moth

Streyella anguinella is a moth of the family Gelechiidae. It is found from south-western Europe to the southern part of the Ural Mountains and the Lower Volga. Outside of Europe, it is found in Turkey, the Near East and North Africa.
