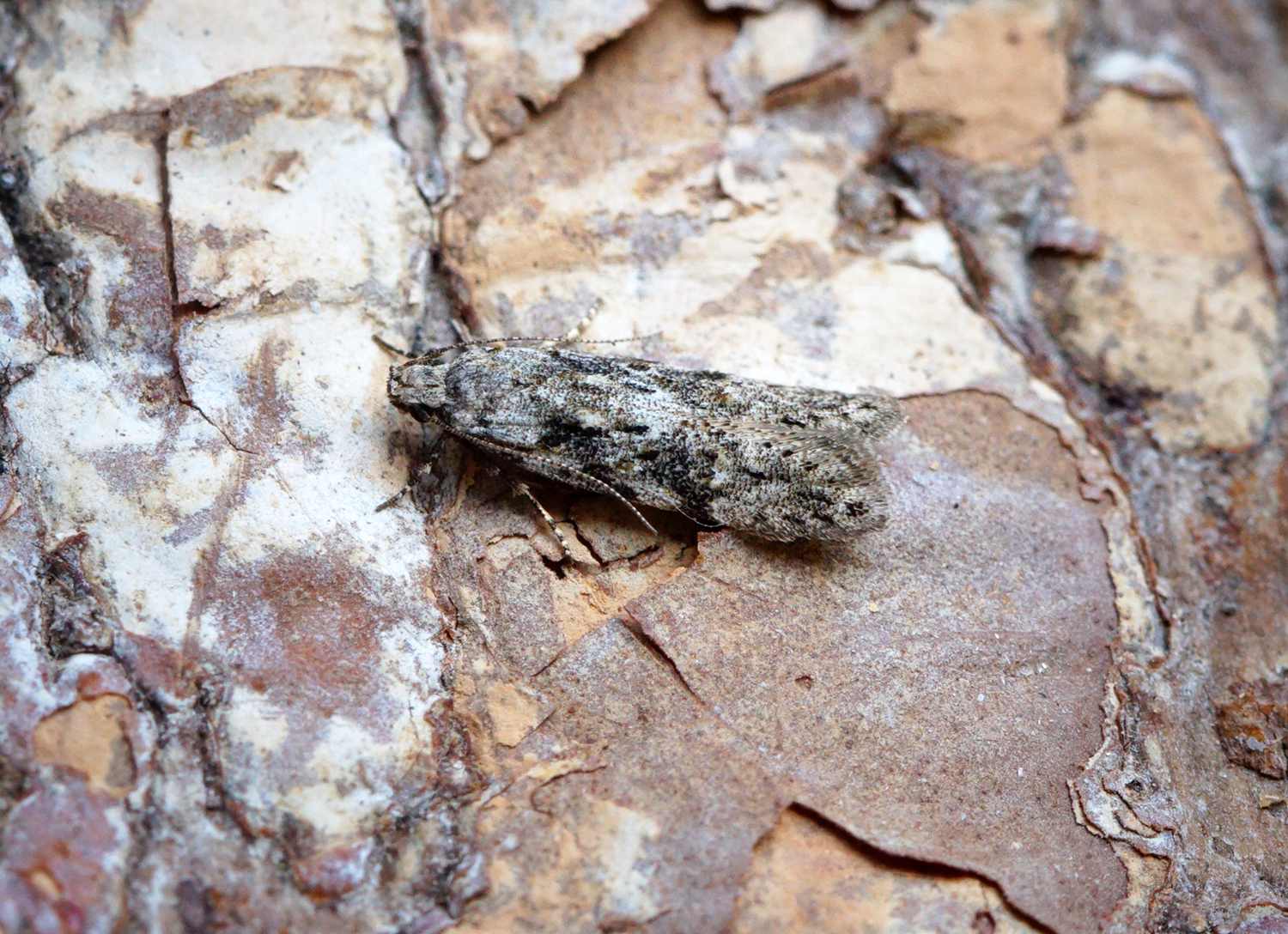
- Carpatolechia notatella Bedfordshire, England

Scientific classification
- Kingdom: Animalia
- Phylum: Arthropoda
- Clade: Pancrustacea
- Class: Insecta
- Order: Lepidoptera
- Family: Gelechiidae
- Genus: Carpatolechia
- Species: C. notatella

Binomial name
- Carpatolechia notatella (Hübner, 1813)

Synonyms
- Tinea notatella Hübner, 1813; Gelechia euratella Herrich-Schäffer, 1854; Teleiodes oskella Piskunov, 1973

= Carpatolechia notatella =

Sallow-leaf groundling

Species of moth

Carpatolechia notatella, the sallow-leaf groundling, is a moth of the family Gelechiidae. It is found in most of Europe (except the Iberian Peninsula and most of the Balkan Peninsula) and Turkey.

The wingspan is 12–16 mm (0.47–0.63 in).The head is whitish, grey sprinkled. Terminal joint of palpi as long as second. Fore wings whitish-grey, brownish-tinged in disc, suffusedly irrorated with dark grey, with a few black scales; darker spots on costa near base and before and beyond middle, and on tornus; a black dot at base of dorsum, and two in disc rather near base stigmata black, first discal beyond plical, preceded by a black dot, another black dot beneath second discal. Hindwings 1, grey. The larva is pale grey-greenish; head black; plate of 2 black posteriorly.

Adults have been recorded on wing from May to June.

The larvae feed on Salix species (including Salix caprea, Salix aurita, Salix petrandra, Salix cinerea, Salix repens and Salix alba). They feed on the parenchyma on the underside of the leaves. Larvae can be found from August to September.
