= Istrianis brucinella =

Scientific classification
- Domain: Eukaryota
- Kingdom: Animalia
- Phylum: Arthropoda
- Class: Insecta
- Order: Lepidoptera
- Family: Gelechiidae
- Genus: Istrianis
- Species: I. brucinella

Binomial name
- Istrianis brucinella (Mann, 1872)

Synonyms
- Gelechia brucinella Mann, 1872; Teleiodes brucinella

Species of moth

Istrianis brucinella is a moth of the family Gelechiidae. It is found on Sicily, in Croatia, Russia, Asia Minor, Egypt, India and Pakistan.

The forewings are pale yellowish, densely sprinkled with darker. The hindwings are light grey.

The larvae feed within galls on Tamarix species.
