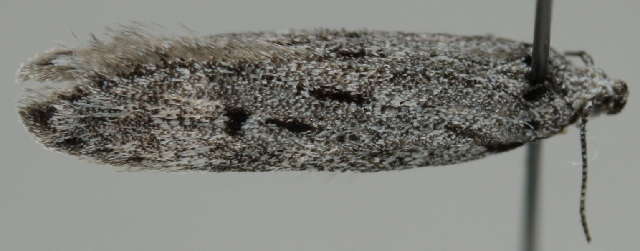

Scientific classification
- Domain: Eukaryota
- Kingdom: Animalia
- Phylum: Arthropoda
- Class: Insecta
- Order: Lepidoptera
- Family: Gelechiidae
- Genus: Carpatolechia
- Species: C. epomidella

Binomial name
- Carpatolechia epomidella (Tengström, 1869)

Synonyms
- Gelechia epomidella Tengström, 1869; Teleiodes epomidella

= Carpatolechia epomidella =

Species of moth

Carpatolechia epomidella is a moth of the family Gelechiidae. It is found in Sweden, Finland, Estonia, Latvia and Russia.

The wingspan is 17–18 mm.

The larvae feed on Ledum palustre.
