= Telphusa necromantis =

Scientific classification
- Domain: Eukaryota
- Kingdom: Animalia
- Phylum: Arthropoda
- Class: Insecta
- Order: Lepidoptera
- Family: Gelechiidae
- Genus: Telphusa
- Species: T. necromantis

Binomial name
- Telphusa necromantis Meyrick, 1932

Synonyms
- Nuntia necromantis

Species of moth

Telphusa necromantis is a moth of the family Gelechiidae. It lives in South Korea, Japan, and China.
