= Carpatolechia aenigma =

Scientific classification
- Kingdom: Animalia
- Phylum: Arthropoda
- Class: Insecta
- Order: Lepidoptera
- Family: Gelechiidae
- Genus: Carpatolechia
- Species: C. aenigma

Binomial name
- Carpatolechia aenigma (Sattler, 1983)

Synonyms
- Teleiodes aenigma Sattler, 1983

Species of moth

Carpatolechia aenigma is a moth of the family Gelechiidae. It is found in France, Germany, the Netherlands, Italy, Austria, the Czech Republic, Slovakia, Poland, Hungary, Romania, Greece, Ukraine and Russia (the Ural Mountains and Lower Volga).

The wingspan is 10–13 mm. Adults have been recorded on wing from May to July.

The larvae have been recorded feeding on Tilia cordata and Quercus robur.
