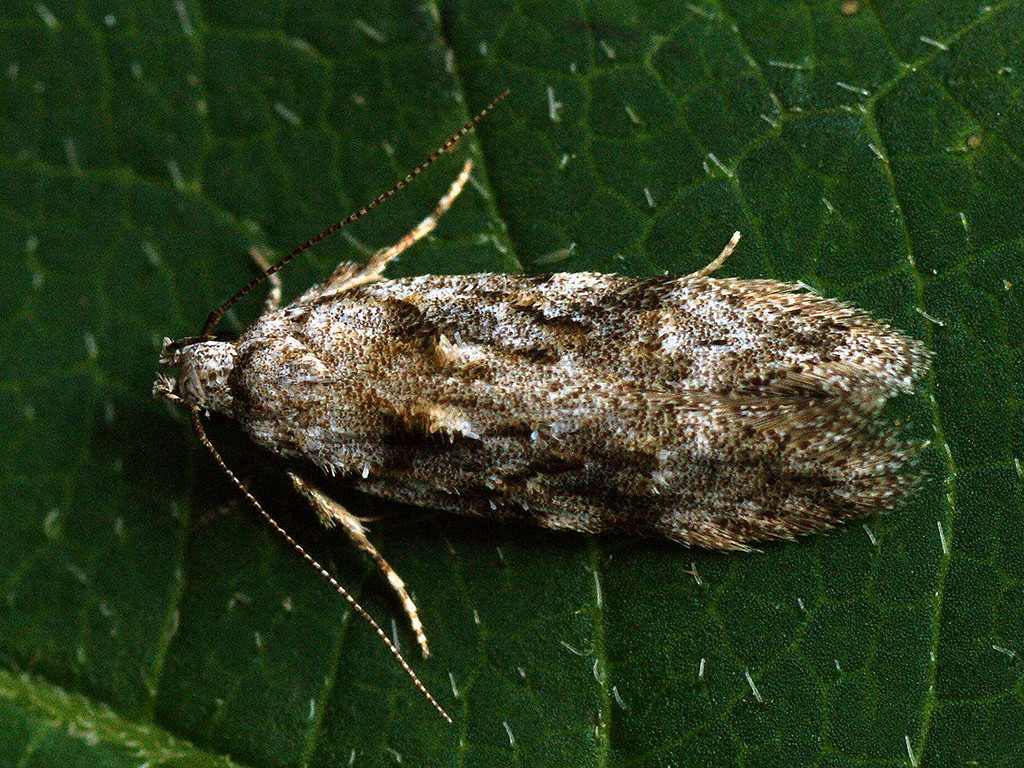
- Carpatolechia fugitivella Moscow Oblast, Russia

Scientific classification
- Kingdom: Animalia
- Phylum: Arthropoda
- Clade: Pancrustacea
- Class: Insecta
- Order: Lepidoptera
- Family: Gelechiidae
- Genus: Carpatolechia
- Species: C. fugitivella

Binomial name
- Carpatolechia fugitivella (Zeller, 1839)

Synonyms
- Gelechia fugitivella Zeller, 1839; Teleiodes fugitivella; Klaussattleria vovkella Piskunov, 1973; Teleiodes vovkella; Carpatolechia fugitivella deserta Emelyanov, 1982; Teleia fugitivella ab. melanella Romaniszyn, 1933

= Carpatolechia fugitivella =

Elm groundling

Species of moth

Carpatolechia fugitivella, the elm groundling, is a moth of the family Gelechiidae. It is found in almost all of Europe (except Portugal, Croatia and Bulgaria), Turkey, the Caucasus, Mongolia, southern Siberia, the Russian Far East and Korea. It is also found in Canada, where it has been recorded from Ontario and Quebec. The habitat consists of woodland, parks, gardens and hedgerows.

The wingspan is 11–15 mm. The head is whitish, grey sprinkled. Terminal joint of palpi longer than second. Forewings are grey, irrorated with blackish; suffused blackish spots on costa near base and before and beyond middle; a blackish streak along fold, sometimes interrupted into two or three spots; two black dots transversely placed in disc at 2/3; a pale angulated fascia at 3/4 sometimes indicated by darker anterior suffusion. Hindwings are grey. The larva is light green, above reddish-tinged; dots black; head and plate of 2 light brown.

Adults have been recorded on wing from June to September.

The larvae feed on Ulmus species (including Ulmus glabra), Quercus, Corylus, Prunus avium, Pyracantha coccinea, Acer, Tilia and Fraxinus species.
