= Carpatolechia minor =

Scientific classification
- Domain: Eukaryota
- Kingdom: Animalia
- Phylum: Arthropoda
- Class: Insecta
- Order: Lepidoptera
- Family: Gelechiidae
- Genus: Carpatolechia
- Species: C. minor

Binomial name
- Carpatolechia minor (Kasy, 1978)

Synonyms
- Teleiodes minor Kasy, 1978

Species of moth

Carpatolechia minor is a moth of the family Gelechiidae. It is found in Austria.

The wingspan is 12.9–14.3 mm.

The larvae feed on Ulmus minor. They are light brown.
