= Altenia mersinella =

Scientific classification
- Domain: Eukaryota
- Kingdom: Animalia
- Phylum: Arthropoda
- Class: Insecta
- Order: Lepidoptera
- Family: Gelechiidae
- Genus: Altenia
- Species: A. mersinella

Binomial name
- Altenia mersinella (Staudinger, 1879)

Synonyms
- Teleia mersinella Staudinger, 1879; Gelechia praedicta Meyrick, 1923; Stenolechia sagittella Caradja, 1920; Telphusa tribolopis Meyrick, 1927; Telphusa melanostictella Ragonot, 1895

Species of moth

Altenia mersinella is a moth of the family Gelechiidae. It is found on Cyprus and in Turkey, Syria and the Palestinian Territories.

The wingspan is about 13 mm. The forewings are white, partially freckled greyish-ochreous with black markings. There is an elongate spot on the costa at the base, a semi-fusiform spot before the middle, and a semi-oval spot beyond the middle. There are trifurcate marks in disc at one-third and two-thirds, the second connected with third the costal spot. There are a few blackish specks around the apical margin. The hindwings are grey-whitish.
