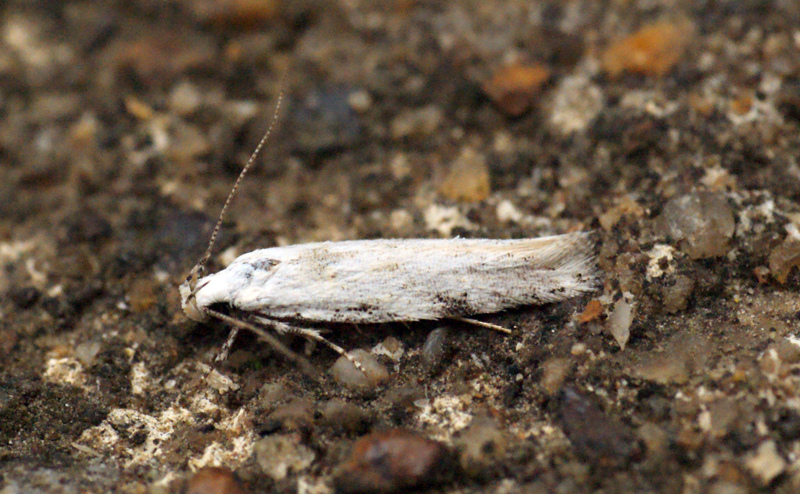

Scientific classification
- Kingdom: Animalia
- Phylum: Arthropoda
- Clade: Pancrustacea
- Class: Insecta
- Order: Lepidoptera
- Family: Gelechiidae
- Genus: Carpatolechia
- Species: C. alburnella

Binomial name
- Carpatolechia alburnella (Zeller, 1839)

Synonyms
- Gelechia alburnella Zeller, 1839; Teleiodes alburnella; Gelechia alburnella ab. radiella Krulikovski, 1909; Lita seniculella Eversmann, 1844

= Carpatolechia alburnella =

Species of moth

Carpatolechia alburnella, the suffused groundling, is a moth of the family Gelechiidae. It is found from most of Europe (except Ireland and the Balkan Peninsula) to Siberia. The habitat consists of woodland and heathland.

The wingspan is 13–16 mm. Adults have been recorded on wing from June to August.

The larvae feed on Betula species. They live between spun or folded leaves of their host plant. The species overwinters as an egg.
