= Istrianis femoralis =

Scientific classification
- Kingdom: Animalia
- Phylum: Arthropoda
- Class: Insecta
- Order: Lepidoptera
- Family: Gelechiidae
- Genus: Istrianis
- Species: I. femoralis

Binomial name
- Istrianis femoralis (Staudinger, 1876)

Synonyms
- Teleia femoralis Staudinger, 1876; Teleia comedonella Staudinger, 1880; Teleia gravosensis Rebel, 1937; Teleia angustipennis Rebel, 1941; Teleia funebrella Rebel, 1941

Species of moth

Istrianis femoralis is a moth of the family Gelechiidae. It is found on Sicily, Cyprus and in Italy, Slovenia, Croatia, North Macedonia, Greece, the Crimea and Turkey.

The wingspan is 9–10 mm.

The larvae feed on Pistacia mutica and Pistacia vera.
