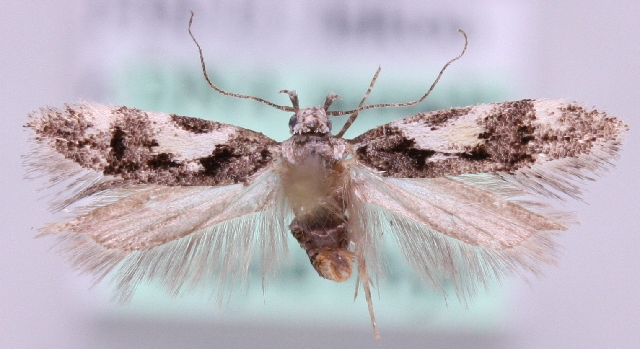

Scientific classification
- Kingdom: Animalia
- Phylum: Arthropoda
- Clade: Pancrustacea
- Class: Insecta
- Order: Lepidoptera
- Family: Gelechiidae
- Genus: Teleiodes
- Species: T. luculella

Binomial name
- Teleiodes luculella (Hübner, 1813)

Synonyms
- Tinea luculella Hübner, 1813; Recurvaria subrosea Haworth, 1828

= Teleiodes luculella =

Species of moth

Teleiodes luculella, the crescent groundling, is a moth of the family Gelechiidae. It is found from Europe to the southern Ural and Transcaucasia. The habitat consists of woodlands, including oak woodlands.

The wingspan is 9–13 mm. The head is white, mixed with black. Terminal joint of palpi shorter than second. Forewings are dark grey, mixed with black; some indistinct whitish spots towards base; a semicircular white costal blotch before middle, enclosing a blackish costal mark, and posteriorly suffused with yellow-ochreous in disc; a small whitish tornal spot, and a larger one on costa opposite. Hindwings under 1, grey. The larva is whitish green; dots black; head yellow-brown; plate of 2 yellow brown, black-marked

Adults are on wing from May to June.

The larvae feed on Quercus, Castanea sativa, Betula, Acer and Salix eleagnos.
