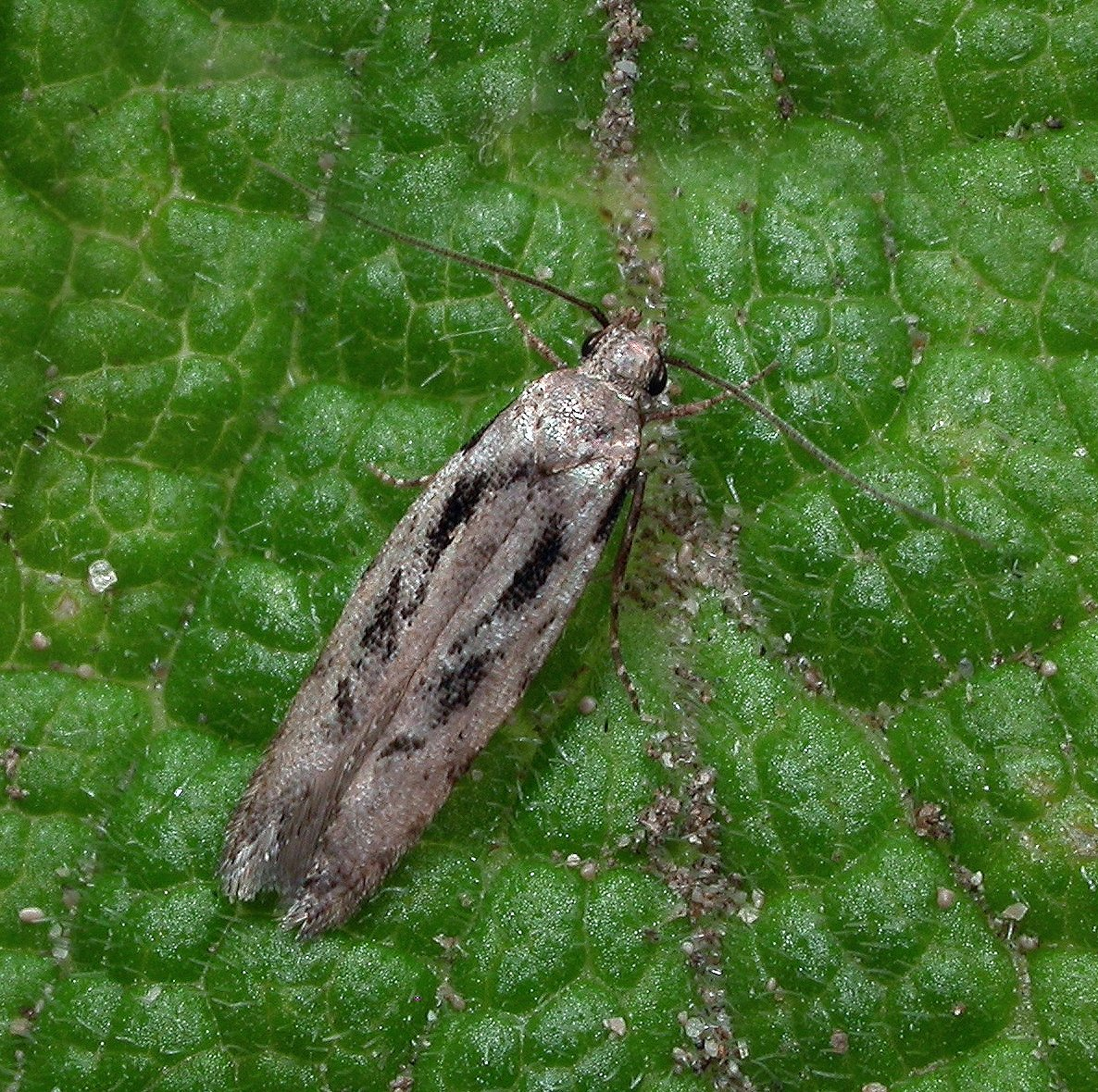

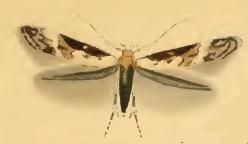

Scientific classification
- Kingdom: Animalia
- Phylum: Arthropoda
- Clade: Pancrustacea
- Class: Insecta
- Order: Lepidoptera
- Family: Gelechiidae
- Genus: Carpatolechia
- Species: C. decorella

Binomial name
- Carpatolechia decorella (Haworth, 1812)

Synonyms
- Tinea decorella Haworth, 1812; Gelechia humeralis Zeller, 1839; Anacampsis lyellella Humphreys & Westwood, 1845; Lita incretella Duponchel, 1845; Lita humeralella Bruand d'uzelle, 1851; Lita marmoripennella Bruand d'uzelle, 1851; Gelechia pisticella Norvicki, 1860; Gelechia scabra Staudinger, 1870; Gelechia erschoffii Frey, 1880; Teleia subericolella Caradja, 1920; Gelechia buckwelli Lucas, 1956; Carpatolechia dumitrescui Capuse, 1964

= Carpatolechia decorella =

Species of moth

Carpatolechia decorella is a moth of the family Gelechiidae. It is found in most of Europe, as well as in Turkey, the Caucasus, Kazakhstan, North Africa and on the Canary Islands.

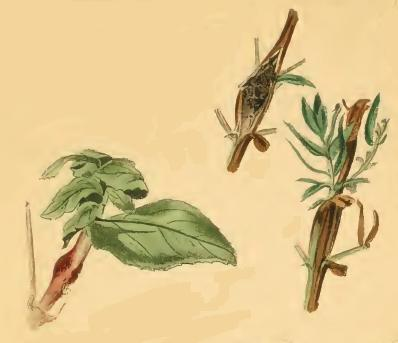
Stems of Epilobium with gall-like swellings caused by the larvae and section of stem inhabited by the larva

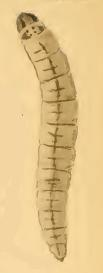
Larva

The wingspan is 11–15 mm. The forewings are ochreous- whitish, often more or less mixed or wholly suffused with fuscous, sometimes ochreous-mixed with a black mark along costa at base; stigmata large, black, very irregular, plical sometimes connected with costal mark, first discal much beyond plical. Hindwings somewhat over 1, light grey.

Adults emerge in July and overwinter. They can sometimes be found again in the following spring.

The larvae feed on Quercus and Cornus species. They feed inside a folded leaf their host plant.
