= Istrianis myricariella =

Scientific classification
- Kingdom: Animalia
- Phylum: Arthropoda
- Class: Insecta
- Order: Lepidoptera
- Family: Gelechiidae
- Genus: Istrianis
- Species: I. myricariella

Binomial name
- Istrianis myricariella (Frey, 1870)

Synonyms
- Gelechia myricariella Frey, 1870; Teleiodes myricariella; Teleia myricariella var. arenicolella Caradja, 1920; Teleia amilcarella Lucas, 1933

Species of moth

Istrianis myricariella is a moth of the family Gelechiidae. It is found in Algeria, Tunisia, the Alps, Portugal, Spain and Greece.

The wingspan is about 11 mm.

The larvae feed on Myricaria germanica.
