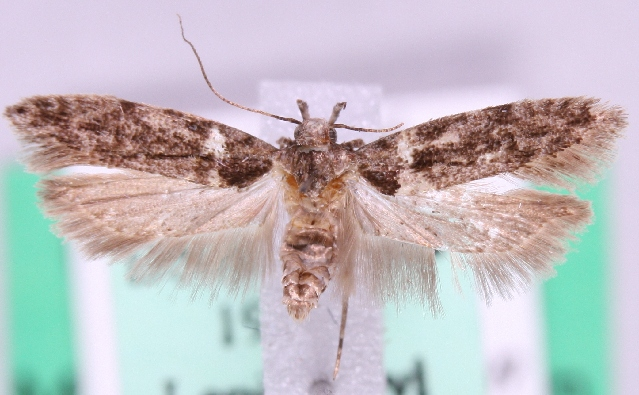

Scientific classification
- Kingdom: Animalia
- Phylum: Arthropoda
- Clade: Pancrustacea
- Class: Insecta
- Order: Lepidoptera
- Family: Gelechiidae
- Genus: Carpatolechia
- Species: C. fugacella

Binomial name
- Carpatolechia fugacella (Zeller, 1839)

Synonyms
- Gelechia fugacella Zeller, 1839; Lita nigrofasciella Bruand, 1850

= Carpatolechia fugacella =

Species of moth

Carpatolechia fugacella is a moth of the family Gelechiidae. It is found in large parts of Europe, except Ireland, Great Britain, Scandinavia, Portugal, the western and southern part of the Balkan Peninsula, Ukraine, Lithuania and Estonia.

The wingspan is 12–15 mm. Adults have been recorded on wing in March and from June to August.

The larvae feed on Ulmus campestris, Ulmus minor and possibly other deciduous trees and shrubs.
