= Altenia inscriptella =

Scientific classification
- Domain: Eukaryota
- Kingdom: Animalia
- Phylum: Arthropoda
- Class: Insecta
- Order: Lepidoptera
- Family: Gelechiidae
- Genus: Altenia
- Species: A. inscriptella

Binomial name
- Altenia inscriptella (Christoph, 1882)

Synonyms
- Teleia inscriptella Christoph, 1882; Carpatolechia inscriptella

Species of moth

Altenia inscriptella is a moth of the family Gelechiidae. It is found in the Russian Far East, Japan and Korea.

The wingspan is 12–16 mm.

The larvae feed on Acer ginnala.
