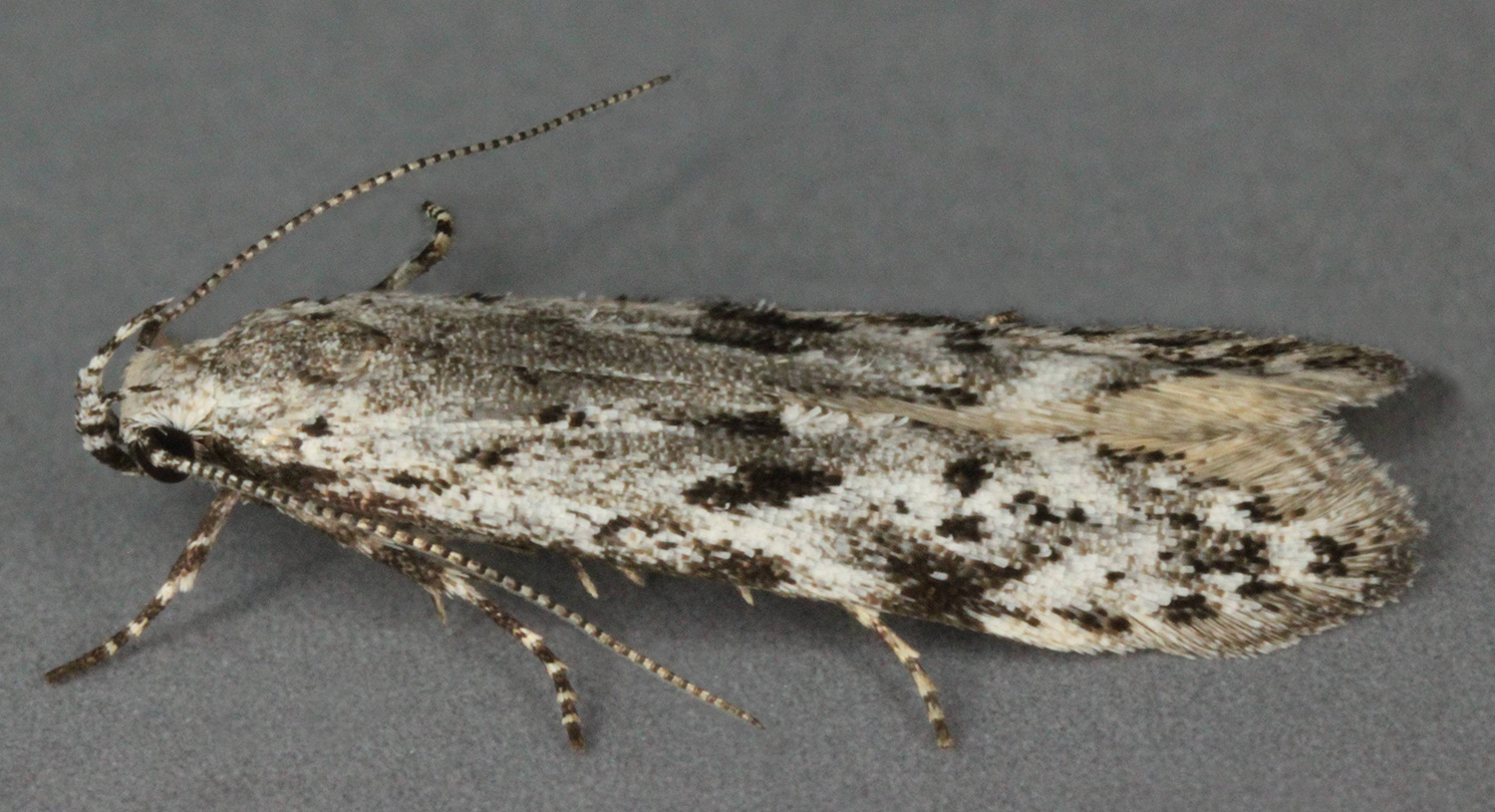
- Carpatolechia proximella, Fenns Moss, North Wales

Scientific classification
- Kingdom: Animalia
- Phylum: Arthropoda
- Clade: Pancrustacea
- Class: Insecta
- Order: Lepidoptera
- Family: Gelechiidae
- Genus: Carpatolechia
- Species: C. proximella

Binomial name
- Carpatolechia proximella (Hübner, 1796)

Synonyms
- Tinea proximella Hübner, 1796; Teleia peritella Constant 1885; Lita signatella Eversmann, 1844; Teleia proximella ab. ochracella Romaniszyn, 1933

= Carpatolechia proximella =

Species of moth

Carpatolechia proximella is a moth of the family Gelechiidae. It is found in most of Europe (except for the Iberian Peninsula and most of the Balkan Peninsula), Turkey, the Caucasus, Central Asia and Siberia.

The wingspan is 13–17 mm. The head is whitish. Terminal joint of palpi shorter than second. Forewings whitish, irrorated with grey, with a few black scales; fine black marks on costa near base and before and beyond middle; two or three black dots or dashes towards base, and one beneath costa at 1/3; stigmata black, first discal beyond plical, preceded by a sometimes confluent black dot, another black dot beneath second discal, and a discal dash beyond it; fuscous costal and tornal spots at 2/3. Hindwings 1, grey. The larva is pale green; dots black; head yellowish.

Adults are on wing from May to June.

The larvae feed on Betula and Alnus.

== Subspecies ==
- Carpatolechia proximella proximella
- Carpatolechia proximella peritella (Constant, 1885) (Corsica)
