= Telphusa syncratopa =

Scientific classification
- Kingdom: Animalia
- Phylum: Arthropoda
- Class: Insecta
- Order: Lepidoptera
- Family: Gelechiidae
- Genus: Telphusa
- Species: T. syncratopa

Binomial name
- Telphusa syncratopa Meyrick, 1935

Species of moth

Telphusa syncratopa is a moth of the family Gelechiidae. It is found in China.
