= Pseudotelphusa paripunctella =

Scientific classification
- Domain: Eukaryota
- Kingdom: Animalia
- Phylum: Arthropoda
- Class: Insecta
- Order: Lepidoptera
- Family: Gelechiidae
- Genus: Pseudotelphusa
- Species: P. paripunctella

Binomial name
- Pseudotelphusa paripunctella (Thunberg, 1794)

Synonyms
- Tinea paripunctella Thunberg, 1794; Telphusa dodecella Wood, 1839; Teleia triparella ab. griseella Preissecker, 1931; Telphusa triparella r. myricae Gilles, 1936; Teleia triparella var. sultanella Caradja, 1920; Oecophora tigratella Costa, 1836; Gelechia trijugella Erschoff, 1877; Gelechia triparella Zeller, 1839; Exoteleia pseudowagae Svensson, 1993

Species of moth

Pseudotelphusa paripunctella is a moth of the family Gelechiidae. It is found from most of Europe to Siberia and the Caucasus.

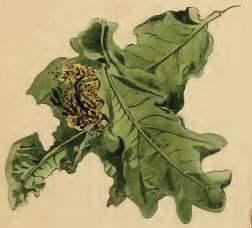
Oak leaves spun together and eaten by larva

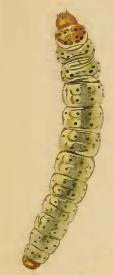
Larva

The wingspan is 9–16 mm. The head is whitish-ochreous. Terminal joint of palpi shorter than second. Forewings whitish ochreous, partly suffused with pale brownish-ochreous; usually some black scales on a basal dot, two or three costal marks, and round termen in cilia; two black dots transversely placed in disc at 1/4; stigmata black, first discal above plical, another black dot below second discal. Hindwings 1, light grey. The larva is yellowish-green; dots black;head pale brown.

Adults are on wing from May to June.

The larvae feed on various deciduous tree and bushes, including Myrica gale, Hippophae rhamnoides, Fagus, Betula and Quercus species. They feed from within spun leaves. The species overwinters in the pupal stage.
