= Istrianis squamodorella =

Scientific classification
- Domain: Eukaryota
- Kingdom: Animalia
- Phylum: Arthropoda
- Class: Insecta
- Order: Lepidoptera
- Family: Gelechiidae
- Genus: Istrianis
- Species: I. squamodorella

Binomial name
- Istrianis squamodorella (Amsel, 1935)

Synonyms
- Pseudoteleia squamodorella Amsel, 1935; Teleiodes squamodorella

Species of moth

Istrianis squamodorella is a moth of the family Gelechiidae. It is found in Palestine and Iraq.

The larvae feed on the leaves of Populus species.
