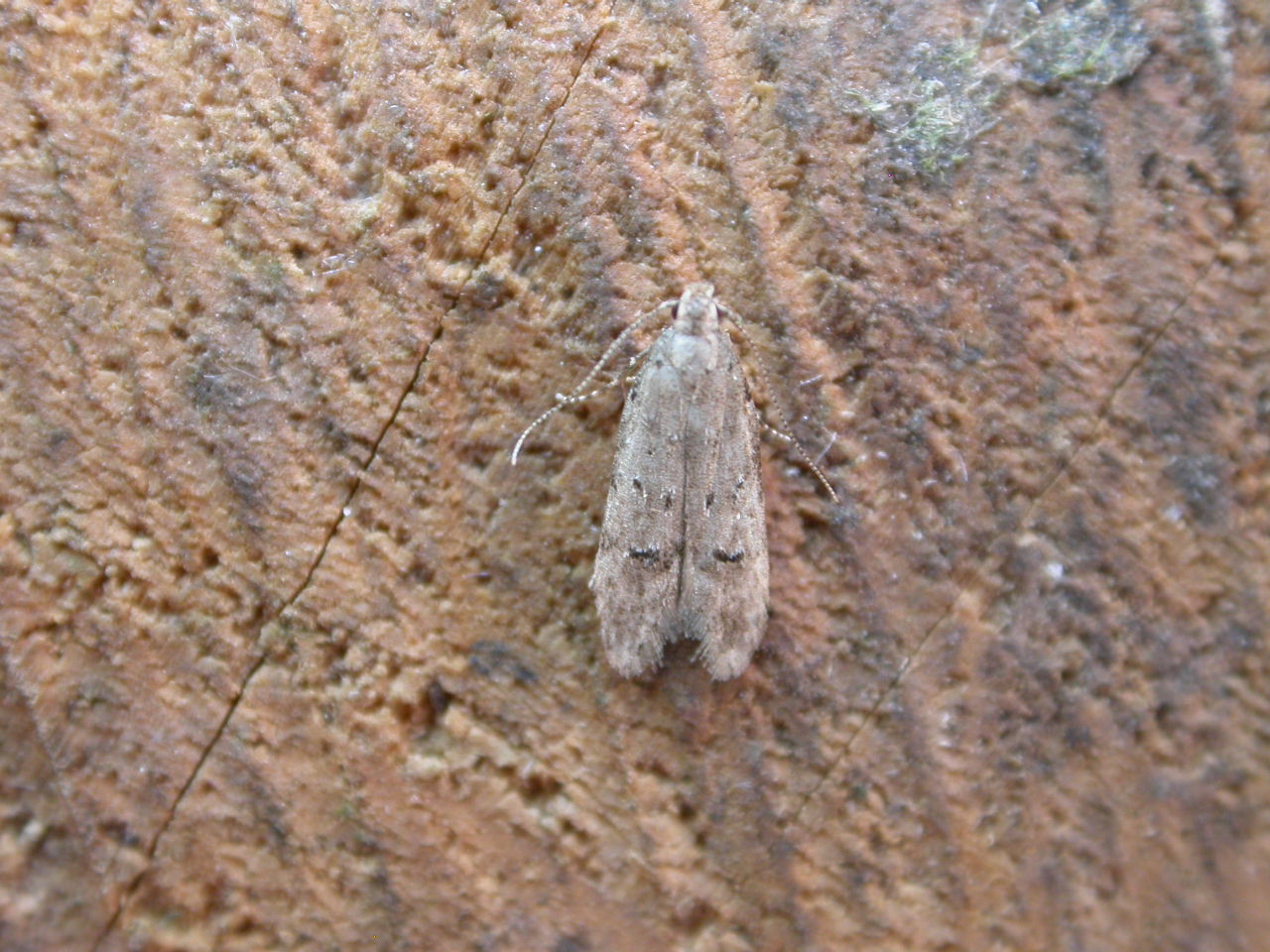

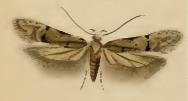

Scientific classification
- Kingdom: Animalia
- Phylum: Arthropoda
- Clade: Pancrustacea
- Class: Insecta
- Order: Lepidoptera
- Family: Gelechiidae
- Genus: Teleiodes
- Species: T. vulgella

Binomial name
- Teleiodes vulgella (Denis & Schiffermüller, 1775)

Synonyms
- Tinea vulgella Denis & Schiffermuller, 1775; Recurvaria aspera Haworth, 1828

= Teleiodes vulgella =

Species of moth

Teleiodes vulgella (common groundling) is a moth of the family Gelechiidae. It is known from most of Europe, east to the southern Ural and the Volga region.

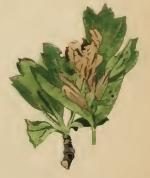
Hawthorn leaves fastened together and eaten by larva

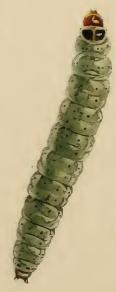
Larva

The wingspan is 11–14 mm. The head is grey, face whitish. Terminal joint of palpi as long as second. Forewings grey, irrorated with darker and some black scales; indistinct blackish spots on costa near base and before and beyond middle; sometimes two black dots transversely placed in disc at 1/4; stigmata black, first discal above plical, second confluent with a blackish bar of raised scales from tornus [small blackish patches bordered by raised whitish scale-tufts]. Hindwings 1, rather dark grey. The larva is greenish-grey; dots black; head ochreous-brown; plate of 2 black, bisected

They are on wing from June to July.

The larva feeds on various shrubs and trees, including Crataegus, Prunus spinosa, Cotoneaster horizontalis, Juniperus communis, Malus domestica, Malus sylvestris, Prunus domestica, Amelanchier, Pyrus communis, Sorbus aria and Sorbus aucuparia.
