= Scrobipalpa chetitica =

Scientific classification
- Kingdom: Animalia
- Phylum: Arthropoda
- Clade: Pancrustacea
- Class: Insecta
- Order: Lepidoptera
- Family: Gelechiidae
- Genus: Scrobipalpa
- Species: S. chetitica

Binomial name
- Scrobipalpa chetitica Povolný, 1974

Synonyms
- Scrobipalpa (Euscrobipalpa) chetitica Povolný, 1974

Species of moth

Scrobipalpa chetitica is a moth in the family Gelechiidae. It was described by Povolný in 1974. It is found in Asia Minor.
