= List of moths of Austria (F–M) =

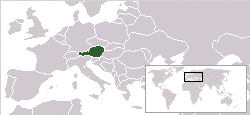
Location of Austria

Lepidoptera of Austria consist of both the butterflies and moths recorded from Austria.

== Moths ==
=== Gelechiidae ===
- Acompsia cinerella (Clerck, 1759)
- Acompsia maculosella (Stainton, 1851)
- Acompsia minorella Rebel, 1899
- Acompsia tripunctella (Denis & Schiffermuller, 1775)
- Acompsia schmidtiellus (Heyden, 1848)
- Agonochaetia intermedia Sattler, 1968
- Altenia scriptella (Hübner, 1796)
- Anacampsis blattariella (Hübner, 1796)
- Anacampsis hirsutella (Constant, 1885)
- Anacampsis obscurella (Denis & Schiffermuller, 1775)
- Anacampsis populella (Clerck, 1759)
- Anacampsis scintillella (Fischer von Röslerstamm, 1841)
- Anacampsis temerella (Lienig & Zeller, 1846)
- Anacampsis timidella (Wocke, 1887)
- Anarsia lineatella Zeller, 1839
- Anarsia spartiella (Schrank, 1802)
- Anasphaltis renigerellus (Zeller, 1839)
- Apodia bifractella (Duponchel, 1843)
- Aproaerema anthyllidella (Hübner, 1813)
- Argolamprotes micella (Denis & Schiffermuller, 1775)
- Aristotelia brizella (Treitschke, 1833)
- Aristotelia decurtella (Hübner, 1813)
- Aristotelia ericinella (Zeller, 1839)
- Aristotelia heliacella (Herrich-Schäffer, 1854)
- Aristotelia leonhardi Krone, 1907
- Aristotelia subdecurtella (Stainton, 1859)
- Aristotelia subericinella (Duponchel, 1843)
- Aroga flavicomella (Zeller, 1839)
- Aroga velocella (Duponchel, 1838)
- Athrips amoenella (Frey, 1882)
- Athrips mouffetella (Linnaeus, 1758)
- Athrips nigricostella (Duponchel, 1842)
- Athrips pruinosella (Lienig & Zeller, 1846)
- Athrips rancidella (Herrich-Schäffer, 1854)
- Atremaea lonchoptera Staudinger, 1871
- Brachmia blandella (Fabricius, 1798)
- Brachmia dimidiella (Denis & Schiffermuller, 1775)
- Brachmia inornatella (Douglas, 1850)
- Brachmia procursella Rebel, 1903
- Bryotropha affinis (Haworth, 1828)
- Bryotropha basaltinella (Zeller, 1839)
- Bryotropha boreella (Douglas, 1851)
- Bryotropha desertella (Douglas, 1850)
- Bryotropha domestica (Haworth, 1828)
- Bryotropha galbanella (Zeller, 1839)
- Bryotropha senectella (Zeller, 1839)
- Bryotropha similis (Stainton, 1854)
- Bryotropha terrella (Denis & Schiffermuller, 1775)
- Carpatolechia aenigma (Sattler, 1983)
- Carpatolechia alburnella (Zeller, 1839)
- Carpatolechia decorella (Haworth, 1812)
- Carpatolechia fugacella (Zeller, 1839)
- Carpatolechia fugitivella (Zeller, 1839)
- Carpatolechia minor (Kasy, 1978)
- Carpatolechia notatella (Hübner, 1813)
- Carpatolechia proximella (Hübner, 1796)
- Caryocolum albifaciella (Heinemann, 1870)
- Caryocolum alsinella (Zeller, 1868)
- Caryocolum amaurella (M. Hering, 1924)
- Caryocolum blandella (Douglas, 1852)
- Caryocolum blandelloides Karsholt, 1981
- Caryocolum cassella (Walker, 1864)
- Caryocolum cauligenella (Schmid, 1863)
- Caryocolum fischerella (Treitschke, 1833)
- Caryocolum huebneri (Haworth, 1828)
- Caryocolum interalbicella (Herrich-Schäffer, 1854)
- Caryocolum junctella (Douglas, 1851)
- Caryocolum klosi (Rebel, 1917)
- Caryocolum kroesmanniella (Herrich-Schäffer, 1854)
- Caryocolum leucomelanella (Zeller, 1839)
- Caryocolum leucothoracellum (Klimesch, 1953)
- Caryocolum marmorea (Haworth, 1828)
- Caryocolum moehringiae (Klimesch, 1954)
- Caryocolum mucronatella (Chretien, 1900)
- Caryocolum oculatella (Thomann, 1930)
- Caryocolum peregrinella (Herrich-Schäffer, 1854)
- Caryocolum petrophila (Preissecker, 1914)
- Caryocolum petryi (O. Hofmann, 1899)
- Caryocolum proxima (Haworth, 1828)
- Caryocolum pullatella (Tengstrom, 1848)
- Caryocolum repentis Huemer & Luquet, 1992
- Caryocolum saginella (Zeller, 1868)
- Caryocolum schleichi (Christoph, 1872)
- Caryocolum tischeriella (Zeller, 1839)
- Caryocolum trauniella (Zeller, 1868)
- Caryocolum tricolorella (Haworth, 1812)
- Caryocolum vicinella (Douglas, 1851)
- Caryocolum viscariella (Stainton, 1855)
- Caulastrocecis furfurella (Staudinger, 1871)
- Chionodes continuella (Zeller, 1839)
- Chionodes distinctella (Zeller, 1839)
- Chionodes electella (Zeller, 1839)
- Chionodes fumatella (Douglas, 1850)
- Chionodes hayreddini Kocak, 1986
- Chionodes holosericella (Herrich-Schäffer, 1854)
- Chionodes luctuella (Hübner, 1793)
- Chionodes lugubrella (Fabricius, 1794)
- Chionodes nebulosella (Heinemann, 1870)
- Chionodes perpetuella (Herrich-Schäffer, 1854)
- Chionodes praeclarella (Herrich-Schäffer, 1854)
- Chionodes tragicella (Heyden, 1865)
- Chionodes viduella (Fabricius, 1794)
- Chrysoesthia drurella (Fabricius, 1775)
- Chrysoesthia sexguttella (Thunberg, 1794)
- Chrysoesthia verrucosa Tokar, 1999
- Coleotechnites piceaella (Kearfott, 1903)
- Cosmardia moritzella (Treitschke, 1835)
- Crossobela trinotella (Herrich-Schäffer, 1856)
- Dactylotula altithermella (Walsingham, 1903)
- Dichomeris alacella (Zeller, 1839)
- Dichomeris barbella (Denis & Schiffermuller, 1775)
- Dichomeris derasella (Denis & Schiffermuller, 1775)
- Dichomeris juniperella (Linnaeus, 1761)
- Dichomeris latipennella (Rebel, 1937)
- Dichomeris limosellus (Schlager, 1849)
- Dichomeris marginella (Fabricius, 1781)
- Dichomeris ustalella (Fabricius, 1794)
- Ephysteris inustella (Zeller, 1847)
- Eulamprotes atrella (Denis & Schiffermuller, 1775)
- Eulamprotes libertinella (Zeller, 1872)
- Eulamprotes plumbella (Heinemann, 1870)
- Eulamprotes superbella (Zeller, 1839)
- Eulamprotes unicolorella (Duponchel, 1843)
- Eulamprotes wilkella (Linnaeus, 1758)
- Exoteleia dodecella (Linnaeus, 1758)
- Exoteleia succinctella (Zeller, 1872)
- Filatima incomptella (Herrich-Schäffer, 1854)
- Filatima spurcella (Duponchel, 1843)
- Filatima tephritidella (Duponchel, 1844)
- Gelechia asinella (Hübner, 1796)
- Gelechia basipunctella Herrich-Schäffer, 1854
- Gelechia cuneatella Douglas, 1852
- Gelechia hippophaella (Schrank, 1802)
- Gelechia muscosella Zeller, 1839
- Gelechia nigra (Haworth, 1828)
- Gelechia rhombella (Denis & Schiffermuller, 1775)
- Gelechia rhombelliformis Staudinger, 1871
- Gelechia sabinellus (Zeller, 1839)
- Gelechia scotinella Herrich-Schäffer, 1854
- Gelechia senticetella (Staudinger, 1859)
- Gelechia sestertiella Herrich-Schäffer, 1854
- Gelechia sororculella (Hübner, 1817)
- Gelechia turpella (Denis & Schiffermuller, 1775)
- Gnorimoschema epithymella (Staudinger, 1859)
- Gnorimoschema hoefneri (Rebel, 1909)
- Gnorimoschema nilsi Huemer, 1996
- Gnorimoschema steueri Povolny, 1975
- Gnorimoschema streliciella (Herrich-Schäffer, 1854)
- Gnorimoschema valesiella (Staudinger, 1877)
- Helcystogramma arulensis (Rebel, 1929)
- Helcystogramma lineolella (Zeller, 1839)
- Helcystogramma lutatella (Herrich-Schäffer, 1854)
- Helcystogramma rufescens (Haworth, 1828)
- Helcystogramma triannulella (Herrich-Schäffer, 1854)
- Hypatima rhomboidella (Linnaeus, 1758)
- Isophrictis anthemidella (Wocke, 1871)
- Isophrictis striatella (Denis & Schiffermuller, 1775)
- Iwaruna biguttella (Duponchel, 1843)
- Iwaruna klimeschi Wolff, 1958
- Klimeschiopsis kiningerella (Duponchel, 1843)
- Megacraspedus balneariellus (Chretien, 1907)
- Megacraspedus binotella (Duponchel, 1843)
- Megacraspedus dolosellus (Zeller, 1839)
- Megacraspedus imparellus (Fischer von Röslerstamm, 1843)
- Megacraspedus lanceolellus (Zeller, 1850)
- Megacraspedus separatellus (Fischer von Röslerstamm, 1843)
- Mesophleps silacella (Hübner, 1796)
- Metzneria aestivella (Zeller, 1839)
- Metzneria aprilella (Herrich-Schäffer, 1854)
- Metzneria artificella (Herrich-Schäffer, 1861)
- Metzneria ehikeella Gozmany, 1954
- Metzneria lappella (Linnaeus, 1758)
- Metzneria metzneriella (Stainton, 1851)
- Metzneria neuropterella (Zeller, 1839)
- Metzneria paucipunctella (Zeller, 1839)
- Metzneria santolinella (Amsel, 1936)
- Mirificarma cytisella (Treitschke, 1833)
- Mirificarma eburnella (Denis & Schiffermuller, 1775)
- Mirificarma interrupta (Curtis, 1827)
- Mirificarma lentiginosella (Zeller, 1839)
- Mirificarma maculatella (Hübner, 1796)
- Mirificarma mulinella (Zeller, 1839)
- Monochroa conspersella (Herrich-Schäffer, 1854)
- Monochroa cytisella (Curtis, 1837)
- Monochroa divisella (Douglas, 1850)
- Monochroa elongella (Heinemann, 1870)
- Monochroa hornigi (Staudinger, 1883)
- Monochroa inflexella Svensson, 1992
- Monochroa lucidella (Stephens, 1834)
- Monochroa lutulentella (Zeller, 1839)
- Monochroa nomadella (Zeller, 1868)
- Monochroa palustrellus (Douglas, 1850)
- Monochroa parvulata (Gozmany, 1957)
- Monochroa rumicetella (O. Hofmann, 1868)
- Monochroa sepicolella (Herrich-Schäffer, 1854)
- Monochroa servella (Zeller, 1839)
- Monochroa simplicella (Lienig & Zeller, 1846)
- Monochroa suffusella (Douglas, 1850)
- Monochroa tenebrella (Hübner, 1817)
- Neofaculta ericetella (Geyer, 1832)
- Neofaculta infernella (Herrich-Schäffer, 1854)
- Neofriseria peliella (Treitschke, 1835)
- Neofriseria singula (Staudinger, 1876)
- Neotelphusa sequax (Haworth, 1828)
- Nothris lemniscellus (Zeller, 1839)
- Nothris verbascella (Denis & Schiffermuller, 1775)
- Parachronistis albiceps (Zeller, 1839)
- Paranarsia joannisiella Ragonot, 1895
- Parastenolechia nigrinotella (Zeller, 1847)
- Pexicopia malvella (Hübner, 1805)
- Phthorimaea operculella (Zeller, 1873)
- Platyedra subcinerea (Haworth, 1828)
- Pogochaetia solitaria Staudinger, 1879
- Prolita sexpunctella (Fabricius, 1794)
- Prolita solutella (Zeller, 1839)
- Pseudotelphusa paripunctella (Thunberg, 1794)
- Pseudotelphusa scalella (Scopoli, 1763)
- Pseudotelphusa tessella (Linnaeus, 1758)
- Psoricoptera gibbosella (Zeller, 1839)
- Ptocheuusa abnormella (Herrich-Schäffer, 1854)
- Ptocheuusa inopella (Zeller, 1839)
- Ptocheuusa paupella (Zeller, 1847)
- Pyncostola bohemiella (Nickerl, 1864)
- Recurvaria leucatella (Clerck, 1759)
- Recurvaria nanella (Denis & Schiffermuller, 1775)
- Sattleria melaleucella (Constant, 1865)
- Sattleria styriaca Pitkin & Sattler, 1991
- Scrobipalpa acuminatella (Sircom, 1850)
- Scrobipalpa arenbergeri Povolny, 1973
- Scrobipalpa artemisiella (Treitschke, 1833)
- Scrobipalpa atriplicella (Fischer von Röslerstamm, 1841)
- Scrobipalpa brahmiella (Heyden, 1862)
- Scrobipalpa chrysanthemella (E. Hofmann, 1867)
- Scrobipalpa erichi Povolny, 1964
- Scrobipalpa feralella (Zeller, 1872)
- Scrobipalpa halonella (Herrich-Schäffer, 1854)
- Scrobipalpa hungariae (Staudinger, 1871)
- Scrobipalpa hyoscyamella (Stainton, 1869)
- Scrobipalpa murinella (Duponchel, 1843)
- Scrobipalpa nitentella (Fuchs, 1902)
- Scrobipalpa obsoletella (Fischer von Röslerstamm, 1841)
- Scrobipalpa ocellatella (Boyd, 1858)
- Scrobipalpa pauperella (Heinemann, 1870)
- Scrobipalpa proclivella (Fuchs, 1886)
- Scrobipalpa rebeli (Preissecker, 1914)
- Scrobipalpa salicorniae (E. Hering, 1889)
- Scrobipalpa samadensis (Pfaffenzeller, 1870)
- Scrobipalpa stangei (E. Hering, 1889)
- Scrobipalpopsis petasitis (Pfaffenzeller, 1867)
- Scrobipalpula diffluella (Frey, 1870)
- Scrobipalpula psilella (Herrich-Schäffer, 1854)
- Scrobipalpula tussilaginis (Stainton, 1867)
- Sitotroga cerealella (Olivier, 1789)
- Sophronia ascalis Gozmany, 1951
- Sophronia chilonella (Treitschke, 1833)
- Sophronia consanguinella Herrich-Schäffer, 1854
- Sophronia humerella (Denis & Schiffermuller, 1775)
- Sophronia illustrella (Hübner, 1796)
- Sophronia semicostella (Hübner, 1813)
- Sophronia sicariellus (Zeller, 1839)
- Stenolechia gemmella (Linnaeus, 1758)
- Stenolechiodes pseudogemmellus Elsner, 1996
- Stomopteryx flavipalpella Jackh, 1959
- Stomopteryx remissella (Zeller, 1847)
- Syncopacma albifrontella (Heinemann, 1870)
- Syncopacma albipalpella (Herrich-Schäffer, 1854)
- Syncopacma azosterella (Herrich-Schäffer, 1854)
- Syncopacma cinctella (Clerck, 1759)
- Syncopacma cincticulella (Bruand, 1851)
- Syncopacma coronillella (Treitschke, 1833)
- Syncopacma incognitana Gozmany, 1957
- Syncopacma larseniella Gozmany, 1957
- Syncopacma linella (Chretien, 1904)
- Syncopacma ochrofasciella (Toll, 1936)
- Syncopacma patruella (Mann, 1857)
- Syncopacma polychromella (Rebel, 1902)
- Syncopacma sangiella (Stainton, 1863)
- Syncopacma suecicella (Wolff, 1958)
- Syncopacma taeniolella (Zeller, 1839)
- Syncopacma vinella (Bankes, 1898)
- Syncopacma wormiella (Wolff, 1958)
- Teleiodes flavimaculella (Herrich-Schäffer, 1854)
- Teleiodes luculella (Hübner, 1813)
- Teleiodes saltuum (Zeller, 1878)
- Teleiodes vulgella (Denis & Schiffermuller, 1775)
- Teleiodes wagae (Nowicki, 1860)
- Teleiopsis albifemorella (E. Hofmann, 1867)
- Teleiopsis bagriotella (Duponchel, 1840)
- Teleiopsis diffinis (Haworth, 1828)
- Thiotricha subocellea (Stephens, 1834)
- Tila capsophilella (Chretien, 1900)
- Tuta absoluta (Meyrick, 1917)
- Xystophora carchariella (Zeller, 1839)
- Xystophora pulveratella (Herrich-Schäffer, 1854)

=== Geometridae ===
- Abraxas grossulariata (Linnaeus, 1758)
- Abraxas sylvata (Scopoli, 1763)
- Acasis appensata (Eversmann, 1842)
- Acasis viretata (Hübner, 1799)
- Aethalura punctulata (Denis & Schiffermuller, 1775)
- Agriopis aurantiaria (Hübner, 1799)
- Agriopis bajaria (Denis & Schiffermuller, 1775)
- Agriopis leucophaearia (Denis & Schiffermuller, 1775)
- Agriopis marginaria (Fabricius, 1776)
- Alcis bastelbergeri (Hirschke, 1908)
- Alcis jubata (Thunberg, 1788)
- Alcis repandata (Linnaeus, 1758)
- Alsophila aceraria (Denis & Schiffermuller, 1775)
- Alsophila aescularia (Denis & Schiffermuller, 1775)
- Angerona prunaria (Linnaeus, 1758)
- Anticlea derivata (Denis & Schiffermuller, 1775)
- Anticollix sparsata (Treitschke, 1828)
- Apeira syringaria (Linnaeus, 1758)
- Aplasta ononaria (Fuessly, 1783)
- Aplocera efformata (Guenee, 1858)
- Aplocera plagiata (Linnaeus, 1758)
- Aplocera praeformata (Hübner, 1826)
- Aplocera simpliciata (Treitschke, 1835)
- Apocheima hispidaria (Denis & Schiffermuller, 1775)
- Archiearis parthenias (Linnaeus, 1761)
- Arichanna melanaria (Linnaeus, 1758)
- Artiora evonymaria (Denis & Schiffermuller, 1775)
- Ascotis selenaria (Denis & Schiffermuller, 1775)
- Aspitates gilvaria (Denis & Schiffermuller, 1775)
- Asthena albulata (Hufnagel, 1767)
- Asthena anseraria (Herrich-Schäffer, 1855)
- Baptria tibiale (Esper, 1791)
- Biston betularia (Linnaeus, 1758)
- Biston strataria (Hufnagel, 1767)
- Boudinotiana notha (Hübner, 1803)
- Boudinotiana puella (Esper, 1787)
- Bupalus piniaria (Linnaeus, 1758)
- Cabera exanthemata (Scopoli, 1763)
- Cabera leptographa Wehrli, 1936
- Cabera pusaria (Linnaeus, 1758)
- Campaea honoraria (Denis & Schiffermuller, 1775)
- Campaea margaritaria (Linnaeus, 1761)
- Camptogramma bilineata (Linnaeus, 1758)
- Camptogramma scripturata (Hübner, 1799)
- Carsia sororiata (Hübner, 1813)
- Cataclysme riguata (Hübner, 1813)
- Catarhoe cuculata (Hufnagel, 1767)
- Catarhoe rubidata (Denis & Schiffermuller, 1775)
- Cepphis advenaria (Hübner, 1790)
- Chariaspilates formosaria (Eversmann, 1837)
- Charissa obscurata (Denis & Schiffermuller, 1775)
- Charissa pullata (Denis & Schiffermuller, 1775)
- Charissa variegata (Duponchel, 1830)
- Charissa ambiguata (Duponchel, 1830)
- Charissa intermedia (Wehrli, 1917)
- Charissa glaucinaria (Hübner, 1799)
- Chesias legatella (Denis & Schiffermuller, 1775)
- Chesias rufata (Fabricius, 1775)
- Chiasmia clathrata (Linnaeus, 1758)
- Chlorissa cloraria (Hübner, 1813)
- Chlorissa viridata (Linnaeus, 1758)
- Chloroclysta miata (Linnaeus, 1758)
- Chloroclysta siterata (Hufnagel, 1767)
- Chloroclystis v-ata (Haworth, 1809)
- Chondrosoma fiduciaria Anker, 1854
- Cidaria fulvata (Forster, 1771)
- Cleora cinctaria (Denis & Schiffermuller, 1775)
- Cleorodes lichenaria (Hufnagel, 1767)
- Coenocalpe lapidata (Hübner, 1809)
- Coenotephria ablutaria (Boisduval, 1840)
- Coenotephria salicata (Denis & Schiffermuller, 1775)
- Coenotephria tophaceata (Denis & Schiffermuller, 1775)
- Colostygia aptata (Hübner, 1813)
- Colostygia aqueata (Hübner, 1813)
- Colostygia austriacaria (Herrich-Schäffer, 1852)
- Colostygia kollariaria (Herrich-Schäffer, 1848)
- Colostygia laetaria (de La Harpe, 1853)
- Colostygia olivata (Denis & Schiffermuller, 1775)
- Colostygia pectinataria (Knoch, 1781)
- Colostygia puengeleri (Stertz, 1902)
- Colostygia tempestaria (Herrich-Schäffer, 1852)
- Colostygia turbata (Hübner, 1799)
- Colotois pennaria (Linnaeus, 1761)
- Comibaena bajularia (Denis & Schiffermuller, 1775)
- Cosmorhoe ocellata (Linnaeus, 1758)
- Costaconvexa polygrammata (Borkhausen, 1794)
- Crocallis elinguaria (Linnaeus, 1758)
- Crocallis tusciaria (Borkhausen, 1793)
- Crocota niveata (Scopoli, 1763)
- Crocota tinctaria (Hübner, 1799)
- Cyclophora linearia (Hübner, 1799)
- Cyclophora porata (Linnaeus, 1767)
- Cyclophora punctaria (Linnaeus, 1758)
- Cyclophora suppunctaria (Zeller, 1847)
- Cyclophora albiocellaria (Hübner, 1789)
- Cyclophora albipunctata (Hufnagel, 1767)
- Cyclophora annularia (Fabricius, 1775)
- Cyclophora pendularia (Clerck, 1759)
- Cyclophora puppillaria (Hübner, 1799)
- Cyclophora quercimontaria (Bastelberger, 1897)
- Cyclophora ruficiliaria (Herrich-Schäffer, 1855)
- Deileptenia ribeata (Clerck, 1759)
- Dyscia conspersaria (Denis & Schiffermuller, 1775)
- Dyscia raunaria (Freyer, 1852)
- Dyscia fagaria (Thunberg, 1784)
- Dysstroma citrata (Linnaeus, 1761)
- Dysstroma truncata (Hufnagel, 1767)
- Earophila badiata (Denis & Schiffermuller, 1775)
- Ecliptopera capitata (Herrich-Schäffer, 1839)
- Ecliptopera silaceata (Denis & Schiffermuller, 1775)
- Ectropis crepuscularia (Denis & Schiffermuller, 1775)
- Eilicrinia cordiaria (Hübner, 1790)
- Electrophaes corylata (Thunberg, 1792)
- Elophos caelibaria (Heydenreich, 1851)
- Elophos operaria (Hübner, 1813)
- Elophos zelleraria (Freyer, 1836)
- Elophos zirbitzensis (Pieszcek, 1902)
- Elophos dilucidaria (Denis & Schiffermuller, 1775)
- Elophos serotinaria (Denis & Schiffermuller, 1775)
- Elophos vittaria (Thunberg, 1788)
- Ematurga atomaria (Linnaeus, 1758)
- Ennomos alniaria (Linnaeus, 1758)
- Ennomos autumnaria (Werneburg, 1859)
- Ennomos erosaria (Denis & Schiffermuller, 1775)
- Ennomos fuscantaria (Haworth, 1809)
- Ennomos quercaria (Hübner, 1813)
- Ennomos quercinaria (Hufnagel, 1767)
- Entephria caesiata (Denis & Schiffermuller, 1775)
- Entephria cyanata (Hübner, 1809)
- Entephria flavata (Osthelder, 1929)
- Entephria flavicinctata (Hübner, 1813)
- Entephria infidaria (de La Harpe, 1853)
- Entephria nobiliaria (Herrich-Schäffer, 1852)
- Epilobophora sabinata (Geyer, 1831)
- Epione repandaria (Hufnagel, 1767)
- Epione vespertaria (Linnaeus, 1767)
- Epirranthis diversata (Denis & Schiffermuller, 1775)
- Epirrhoe alternata (Muller, 1764)
- Epirrhoe galiata (Denis & Schiffermuller, 1775)
- Epirrhoe hastulata (Hübner, 1790)
- Epirrhoe molluginata (Hübner, 1813)
- Epirrhoe pupillata (Thunberg, 1788)
- Epirrhoe rivata (Hübner, 1813)
- Epirrhoe tristata (Linnaeus, 1758)
- Epirrita autumnata (Borkhausen, 1794)
- Epirrita christyi (Allen, 1906)
- Epirrita dilutata (Denis & Schiffermuller, 1775)
- Erannis defoliaria (Clerck, 1759)
- Euchoeca nebulata (Scopoli, 1763)
- Eulithis mellinata (Fabricius, 1787)
- Eulithis populata (Linnaeus, 1758)
- Eulithis prunata (Linnaeus, 1758)
- Eulithis testata (Linnaeus, 1761)
- Eumannia lepraria (Rebel, 1909)
- Euphyia adumbraria (Herrich-Schäffer, 1852)
- Euphyia biangulata (Haworth, 1809)
- Euphyia frustata (Treitschke, 1828)
- Euphyia mesembrina (Rebel, 1927)
- Euphyia unangulata (Haworth, 1809)
- Eupithecia abbreviata Stephens, 1831
- Eupithecia abietaria (Goeze, 1781)
- Eupithecia absinthiata (Clerck, 1759)
- Eupithecia actaeata Walderdorff, 1869
- Eupithecia addictata Dietze, 1908
- Eupithecia alliaria Staudinger, 1870
- Eupithecia analoga Djakonov, 1926
- Eupithecia assimilata Doubleday, 1856
- Eupithecia carpophagata Staudinger, 1871
- Eupithecia cauchiata (Duponchel, 1831)
- Eupithecia centaureata (Denis & Schiffermuller, 1775)
- Eupithecia conterminata (Lienig, 1846)
- Eupithecia cretaceata (Packard, 1874)
- Eupithecia denotata (Hübner, 1813)
- Eupithecia distinctaria Herrich-Schäffer, 1848
- Eupithecia dodoneata Guenee, 1858
- Eupithecia druentiata Dietze, 1902
- Eupithecia egenaria Herrich-Schäffer, 1848
- Eupithecia ericeata (Rambur, 1833)
- Eupithecia exiguata (Hübner, 1813)
- Eupithecia expallidata Doubleday, 1856
- Eupithecia extraversaria Herrich-Schäffer, 1852
- Eupithecia extremata (Fabricius, 1787)
- Eupithecia gemellata Herrich-Schäffer, 1861
- Eupithecia graphata (Treitschke, 1828)
- Eupithecia gueneata Milliere, 1862
- Eupithecia haworthiata Doubleday, 1856
- Eupithecia icterata (de Villers, 1789)
- Eupithecia immundata (Lienig, 1846)
- Eupithecia impurata (Hübner, 1813)
- Eupithecia indigata (Hübner, 1813)
- Eupithecia innotata (Hufnagel, 1767)
- Eupithecia insigniata (Hübner, 1790)
- Eupithecia intricata (Zetterstedt, 1839)
- Eupithecia inturbata (Hübner, 1817)
- Eupithecia irriguata (Hübner, 1813)
- Eupithecia lanceata (Hübner, 1825)
- Eupithecia laquaearia Herrich-Schäffer, 1848
- Eupithecia lariciata (Freyer, 1841)
- Eupithecia linariata (Denis & Schiffermuller, 1775)
- Eupithecia millefoliata Rossler, 1866
- Eupithecia nanata (Hübner, 1813)
- Eupithecia orphnata W. Petersen, 1909
- Eupithecia pauxillaria Boisduval, 1840
- Eupithecia pernotata Guenee, 1858
- Eupithecia pimpinellata (Hübner, 1813)
- Eupithecia plumbeolata (Haworth, 1809)
- Eupithecia pusillata (Denis & Schiffermuller, 1775)
- Eupithecia pygmaeata (Hübner, 1799)
- Eupithecia pyreneata Mabille, 1871
- Eupithecia satyrata (Hübner, 1813)
- Eupithecia schiefereri Bohatsch, 1893
- Eupithecia selinata Herrich-Schäffer, 1861
- Eupithecia semigraphata Bruand, 1850
- Eupithecia silenata Assmann, 1848
- Eupithecia silenicolata Mabille, 1867
- Eupithecia simpliciata (Haworth, 1809)
- Eupithecia sinuosaria (Eversmann, 1848)
- Eupithecia subfuscata (Haworth, 1809)
- Eupithecia subumbrata (Denis & Schiffermuller, 1775)
- Eupithecia succenturiata (Linnaeus, 1758)
- Eupithecia tantillaria Boisduval, 1840
- Eupithecia tenuiata (Hübner, 1813)
- Eupithecia thalictrata (Pungeler, 1902)
- Eupithecia tripunctaria Herrich-Schäffer, 1852
- Eupithecia trisignaria Herrich-Schäffer, 1848
- Eupithecia undata (Freyer, 1840)
- Eupithecia valerianata (Hübner, 1813)
- Eupithecia venosata (Fabricius, 1787)
- Eupithecia veratraria Herrich-Schäffer, 1848
- Eupithecia virgaureata Doubleday, 1861
- Eupithecia vulgata (Haworth, 1809)
- Eustroma reticulata (Denis & Schiffermuller, 1775)
- Fagivorina arenaria (Hufnagel, 1767)
- Gagitodes sagittata (Fabricius, 1787)
- Gandaritis pyraliata (Denis & Schiffermuller, 1775)
- Geometra papilionaria (Linnaeus, 1758)
- Glacies alpinata (Scopoli, 1763)
- Glacies alticolaria (Mann, 1853)
- Glacies burmanni (Tarmann, 1984)
- Glacies canaliculata (Hochenwarth, 1785)
- Glacies coracina (Esper, 1805)
- Glacies noricana (Wagner, 1898)
- Glacies spitzi (Rebel, 1906)
- Gnophos furvata (Denis & Schiffermuller, 1775)
- Gnophos obfuscata (Denis & Schiffermuller, 1775)
- Gnophos dumetata Treitschke, 1827
- Gymnoscelis rufifasciata (Haworth, 1809)
- Heliomata glarearia (Denis & Schiffermuller, 1775)
- Hemistola chrysoprasaria (Esper, 1795)
- Hemithea aestivaria (Hübner, 1789)
- Horisme aemulata (Hübner, 1813)
- Horisme aquata (Hübner, 1813)
- Horisme calligraphata (Herrich-Schäffer, 1838)
- Horisme corticata (Treitschke, 1835)
- Horisme radicaria (de La Harpe, 1855)
- Horisme tersata (Denis & Schiffermuller, 1775)
- Horisme vitalbata (Denis & Schiffermuller, 1775)
- Hydrelia flammeolaria (Hufnagel, 1767)
- Hydrelia sylvata (Denis & Schiffermuller, 1775)
- Hydria cervinalis (Scopoli, 1763)
- Hydria undulata (Linnaeus, 1758)
- Hydriomena furcata (Thunberg, 1784)
- Hydriomena impluviata (Denis & Schiffermuller, 1775)
- Hydriomena ruberata (Freyer, 1831)
- Hylaea fasciaria (Linnaeus, 1758)
- Hypomecis danieli (Wehrli, 1932)
- Hypomecis punctinalis (Scopoli, 1763)
- Hypomecis roboraria (Denis & Schiffermuller, 1775)
- Hypoxystis pluviaria (Fabricius, 1787)
- Idaea aureolaria (Denis & Schiffermuller, 1775)
- Idaea aversata (Linnaeus, 1758)
- Idaea biselata (Hufnagel, 1767)
- Idaea contiguaria (Hübner, 1799)
- Idaea degeneraria (Hübner, 1799)
- Idaea deversaria (Herrich-Schäffer, 1847)
- Idaea dilutaria (Hübner, 1799)
- Idaea dimidiata (Hufnagel, 1767)
- Idaea emarginata (Linnaeus, 1758)
- Idaea filicata (Hübner, 1799)
- Idaea flaveolaria (Hübner, 1809)
- Idaea fuscovenosa (Goeze, 1781)
- Idaea humiliata (Hufnagel, 1767)
- Idaea inquinata (Scopoli, 1763)
- Idaea laevigata (Scopoli, 1763)
- Idaea moniliata (Denis & Schiffermuller, 1775)
- Idaea muricata (Hufnagel, 1767)
- Idaea nitidata (Herrich-Schäffer, 1861)
- Idaea obsoletaria (Rambur, 1833)
- Idaea ochrata (Scopoli, 1763)
- Idaea pallidata (Denis & Schiffermuller, 1775)
- Idaea rubraria (Staudinger, 1901)
- Idaea rufaria (Hübner, 1799)
- Idaea rusticata (Denis & Schiffermuller, 1775)
- Idaea seriata (Schrank, 1802)
- Idaea sericeata (Hübner, 1813)
- Idaea serpentata (Hufnagel, 1767)
- Idaea straminata (Borkhausen, 1794)
- Idaea subsericeata (Haworth, 1809)
- Idaea sylvestraria (Hübner, 1799)
- Idaea trigeminata (Haworth, 1809)
- Idaea typicata (Guenee, 1858)
- Isturgia arenacearia (Denis & Schiffermuller, 1775)
- Isturgia limbaria (Fabricius, 1775)
- Isturgia murinaria (Denis & Schiffermuller, 1775)
- Isturgia roraria (Fabricius, 1776)
- Jodis lactearia (Linnaeus, 1758)
- Jodis putata (Linnaeus, 1758)
- Lampropteryx otregiata (Metcalfe, 1917)
- Lampropteryx suffumata (Denis & Schiffermuller, 1775)
- Larentia clavaria (Haworth, 1809)
- Ligdia adustata (Denis & Schiffermuller, 1775)
- Lignyoptera fumidaria (Hübner, 1825)
- Lithostege farinata (Hufnagel, 1767)
- Lithostege griseata (Denis & Schiffermuller, 1775)
- Lobophora halterata (Hufnagel, 1767)
- Lomaspilis marginata (Linnaeus, 1758)
- Lomographa bimaculata (Fabricius, 1775)
- Lomographa temerata (Denis & Schiffermuller, 1775)
- Lycia alpina (Sulzer, 1776)
- Lycia hirtaria (Clerck, 1759)
- Lycia isabellae (Harrison, 1914)
- Lycia pomonaria (Hübner, 1790)
- Lycia zonaria (Denis & Schiffermuller, 1775)
- Lythria cruentaria (Hufnagel, 1767)
- Lythria plumularia (Freyer, 1831)
- Lythria purpuraria (Linnaeus, 1758)
- Macaria alternata (Denis & Schiffermuller, 1775)
- Macaria artesiaria (Denis & Schiffermuller, 1775)
- Macaria brunneata (Thunberg, 1784)
- Macaria carbonaria (Clerck, 1759)
- Macaria fusca (Thunberg, 1792)
- Macaria liturata (Clerck, 1759)
- Macaria notata (Linnaeus, 1758)
- Macaria signaria (Hübner, 1809)
- Macaria wauaria (Linnaeus, 1758)
- Martania taeniata (Stephens, 1831)
- Melanthia alaudaria (Freyer, 1846)
- Melanthia procellata (Denis & Schiffermuller, 1775)
- Menophra abruptaria (Thunberg, 1792)
- Mesoleuca albicillata (Linnaeus, 1758)
- Mesotype didymata (Linnaeus, 1758)
- Mesotype parallelolineata (Retzius, 1783)
- Mesotype verberata (Scopoli, 1763)
- Minoa murinata (Scopoli, 1763)
- Narraga fasciolaria (Hufnagel, 1767)
- Narraga tessularia (Metzner, 1845)
- Nebula achromaria (de La Harpe, 1853)
- Nebula nebulata (Treitschke, 1828)
- Nothocasis sertata (Hübner, 1817)
- Nycterosea obstipata (Fabricius, 1794)
- Odezia atrata (Linnaeus, 1758)
- Odontopera bidentata (Clerck, 1759)
- Operophtera brumata (Linnaeus, 1758)
- Operophtera fagata (Scharfenberg, 1805)
- Opisthograptis luteolata (Linnaeus, 1758)
- Orthonama vittata (Borkhausen, 1794)
- Ourapteryx sambucaria (Linnaeus, 1758)
- Pachycnemia hippocastanaria (Hübner, 1799)
- Paradarisa consonaria (Hübner, 1799)
- Parectropis similaria (Hufnagel, 1767)
- Pareulype berberata (Denis & Schiffermuller, 1775)
- Pasiphila chloerata (Mabille, 1870)
- Pasiphila debiliata (Hübner, 1817)
- Pasiphila rectangulata (Linnaeus, 1758)
- Pelurga comitata (Linnaeus, 1758)
- Pennithera firmata (Hübner, 1822)
- Perconia strigillaria (Hübner, 1787)
- Peribatodes rhomboidaria (Denis & Schiffermuller, 1775)
- Peribatodes secundaria (Denis & Schiffermuller, 1775)
- Perizoma affinitata (Stephens, 1831)
- Perizoma albulata (Denis & Schiffermuller, 1775)
- Perizoma alchemillata (Linnaeus, 1758)
- Perizoma bifaciata (Haworth, 1809)
- Perizoma blandiata (Denis & Schiffermuller, 1775)
- Perizoma flavofasciata (Thunberg, 1792)
- Perizoma hydrata (Treitschke, 1829)
- Perizoma incultaria (Herrich-Schäffer, 1848)
- Perizoma lugdunaria (Herrich-Schäffer, 1855)
- Perizoma minorata (Treitschke, 1828)
- Perizoma obsoletata (Herrich-Schäffer, 1838)
- Petrophora chlorosata (Scopoli, 1763)
- Phaiogramma etruscaria (Zeller, 1849)
- Phibalapteryx virgata (Hufnagel, 1767)
- Phigalia pilosaria (Denis & Schiffermuller, 1775)
- Philereme transversata (Hufnagel, 1767)
- Philereme vetulata (Denis & Schiffermuller, 1775)
- Plagodis dolabraria (Linnaeus, 1767)
- Plagodis pulveraria (Linnaeus, 1758)
- Plemyria rubiginata (Denis & Schiffermuller, 1775)
- Pseudopanthera macularia (Linnaeus, 1758)
- Pseudoterpna pruinata (Hufnagel, 1767)
- Psodos quadrifaria (Sulzer, 1776)
- Pterapherapteryx sexalata (Retzius, 1783)
- Pungeleria capreolaria (Denis & Schiffermuller, 1775)
- Rheumaptera hastata (Linnaeus, 1758)
- Rheumaptera subhastata (Nolcken, 1870)
- Rhodometra sacraria (Linnaeus, 1767)
- Rhodostrophia vibicaria (Clerck, 1759)
- Schistostege decussata (Denis & Schiffermuller, 1775)
- Sciadia tenebraria (Esper, 1806)
- Scopula confinaria (Herrich-Schäffer, 1847)
- Scopula emutaria (Hübner, 1809)
- Scopula flaccidaria (Zeller, 1852)
- Scopula floslactata (Haworth, 1809)
- Scopula immutata (Linnaeus, 1758)
- Scopula incanata (Linnaeus, 1758)
- Scopula marginepunctata (Goeze, 1781)
- Scopula subpunctaria (Herrich-Schäffer, 1847)
- Scopula ternata Schrank, 1802
- Scopula caricaria (Reutti, 1853)
- Scopula corrivalaria (Kretschmar, 1862)
- Scopula decorata (Denis & Schiffermuller, 1775)
- Scopula immorata (Linnaeus, 1758)
- Scopula nemoraria (Hübner, 1799)
- Scopula nigropunctata (Hufnagel, 1767)
- Scopula ornata (Scopoli, 1763)
- Scopula rubiginata (Hufnagel, 1767)
- Scopula umbelaria (Hübner, 1813)
- Scopula virgulata (Denis & Schiffermuller, 1775)
- Scotopteryx bipunctaria (Denis & Schiffermuller, 1775)
- Scotopteryx chenopodiata (Linnaeus, 1758)
- Scotopteryx coarctaria (Denis & Schiffermuller, 1775)
- Scotopteryx ignorata Huemer & Hausmann, 1998
- Scotopteryx luridata (Hufnagel, 1767)
- Scotopteryx moeniata (Scopoli, 1763)
- Scotopteryx mucronata (Scopoli, 1763)
- Scotopteryx octodurensis (Favre, 1903)
- Selenia dentaria (Fabricius, 1775)
- Selenia lunularia (Hübner, 1788)
- Selenia tetralunaria (Hufnagel, 1767)
- Selidosema brunnearia (de Villers, 1789)
- Selidosema plumaria (Denis & Schiffermuller, 1775)
- Siona lineata (Scopoli, 1763)
- Spargania luctuata (Denis & Schiffermuller, 1775)
- Stegania cararia (Hübner, 1790)
- Stegania dilectaria (Hübner, 1790)
- Stegania trimaculata (de Villers, 1789)
- Synopsia sociaria (Hübner, 1799)
- Tephronia sepiaria (Hufnagel, 1767)
- Thalera fimbrialis (Scopoli, 1763)
- Thera britannica (Turner, 1925)
- Thera cembrae (Kitt, 1912)
- Thera cognata (Thunberg, 1792)
- Thera juniperata (Linnaeus, 1758)
- Thera obeliscata (Hübner, 1787)
- Thera variata (Denis & Schiffermuller, 1775)
- Thera vetustata (Denis & Schiffermuller, 1775)
- Therapis flavicaria (Denis & Schiffermuller, 1775)
- Theria primaria (Haworth, 1809)
- Theria rupicapraria (Denis & Schiffermuller, 1775)
- Thetidia smaragdaria (Fabricius, 1787)
- Timandra comae Schmidt, 1931
- Trichopteryx carpinata (Borkhausen, 1794)
- Trichopteryx polycommata (Denis & Schiffermuller, 1775)
- Triphosa dubitata (Linnaeus, 1758)
- Triphosa sabaudiata (Duponchel, 1830)
- Venusia blomeri (Curtis, 1832)
- Venusia cambrica Curtis, 1839
- Xanthorhoe biriviata (Borkhausen, 1794)
- Xanthorhoe decoloraria (Esper, 1806)
- Xanthorhoe designata (Hufnagel, 1767)
- Xanthorhoe ferrugata (Clerck, 1759)
- Xanthorhoe fluctuata (Linnaeus, 1758)
- Xanthorhoe incursata (Hübner, 1813)
- Xanthorhoe montanata (Denis & Schiffermuller, 1775)
- Xanthorhoe quadrifasiata (Clerck, 1759)
- Xanthorhoe spadicearia (Denis & Schiffermuller, 1775)

=== Glyphipterigidae ===
- Acrolepia autumnitella Curtis, 1838
- Acrolepiopsis assectella (Zeller, 1839)
- Acrolepiopsis betulella (Curtis, 1838)
- Digitivalva arnicella (Heyden, 1863)
- Digitivalva perlepidella (Stainton, 1849)
- Digitivalva reticulella (Hübner, 1796)
- Digitivalva valeriella (Snellen, 1878)
- Digitivalva granitella (Treitschke, 1833)
- Digitivalva pulicariae (Klimesch, 1956)
- Glyphipterix bergstraesserella (Fabricius, 1781)
- Glyphipterix equitella (Scopoli, 1763)
- Glyphipterix forsterella (Fabricius, 1781)
- Glyphipterix gianelliella Ragonot, 1885
- Glyphipterix haworthana (Stephens, 1834)
- Glyphipterix schoenicolella Boyd, 1859
- Glyphipterix simpliciella (Stephens, 1834)
- Glyphipterix thrasonella (Scopoli, 1763)
- Orthotelia sparganella (Thunberg, 1788)

=== Gracillariidae ===
- Acrocercops brongniardella (Fabricius, 1798)
- Aristaea pavoniella (Zeller, 1847)
- Aspilapteryx limosella (Duponchel, 1843)
- Aspilapteryx spectabilis Huemer, 1994
- Aspilapteryx tringipennella (Zeller, 1839)
- Callisto basistrigella Huemer, Deutsch & Triberti, 2015
- Callisto coffeella (Zetterstedt, 1839)
- Callisto denticulella (Thunberg, 1794)
- Callisto insperatella (Nickerl, 1864)
- Callisto pfaffenzelleri (Frey, 1856)
- Caloptilia alchimiella (Scopoli, 1763)
- Caloptilia azaleella (Brants, 1913)
- Caloptilia betulicola (M. Hering, 1928)
- Caloptilia cuculipennella (Hübner, 1796)
- Caloptilia elongella (Linnaeus, 1761)
- Caloptilia falconipennella (Hübner, 1813)
- Caloptilia fidella (Reutti, 1853)
- Caloptilia fribergensis (Fritzsche, 1871)
- Caloptilia hauderi (Rebel, 1906)
- Caloptilia hemidactylella (Denis & Schiffermuller, 1775)
- Caloptilia honoratella (Rebel, 1914)
- Caloptilia populetorum (Zeller, 1839)
- Caloptilia rhodinella (Herrich-Schäffer, 1855)
- Caloptilia robustella Jackh, 1972
- Caloptilia roscipennella (Hübner, 1796)
- Caloptilia rufipennella (Hübner, 1796)
- Caloptilia semifascia (Haworth, 1828)
- Caloptilia stigmatella (Fabricius, 1781)
- Calybites phasianipennella (Hübner, 1813)
- Calybites quadrisignella (Zeller, 1839)
- Cameraria ohridella Deschka & Dimic, 1986
- Dialectica imperialella (Zeller, 1847)
- Dialectica soffneri (Gregor & Povolny, 1965)
- Euspilapteryx auroguttella Stephens, 1835
- Gracillaria loriolella Frey, 1881
- Gracillaria syringella (Fabricius, 1794)
- Leucospilapteryx omissella (Stainton, 1848)
- Micrurapteryx kollariella (Zeller, 1839)
- Ornixola caudulatella (Zeller, 1839)
- Parectopa ononidis (Zeller, 1839)
- Parectopa robiniella Clemens, 1863
- Parornix alpicola (Wocke, 1877)
- Parornix anglicella (Stainton, 1850)
- Parornix anguliferella (Zeller, 1847)
- Parornix betulae (Stainton, 1854)
- Parornix carpinella (Frey, 1863)
- Parornix devoniella (Stainton, 1850)
- Parornix fagivora (Frey, 1861)
- Parornix finitimella (Zeller, 1850)
- Parornix ornatella Triberti, 1981
- Parornix petiolella (Frey, 1863)
- Parornix scoticella (Stainton, 1850)
- Parornix szocsi Gozmany, 1952
- Parornix tenella (Rebel, 1919)
- Parornix torquillella (Zeller, 1850)
- Phyllocnistis labyrinthella (Bjerkander, 1790)
- Phyllocnistis saligna (Zeller, 1839)
- Phyllocnistis unipunctella (Stephens, 1834)
- Phyllocnistis xenia M. Hering, 1936
- Phyllonorycter abrasella (Duponchel, 1843)
- Phyllonorycter acaciella (Duponchel, 1843)
- Phyllonorycter acerifoliella (Zeller, 1839)
- Phyllonorycter aemula Triberti, Deschka & Huemer, 1997
- Phyllonorycter agilella (Zeller, 1846)
- Phyllonorycter alpina (Frey, 1856)
- Phyllonorycter anderidae (W. Fletcher, 1885)
- Phyllonorycter apparella (Herrich-Schäffer, 1855)
- Phyllonorycter blancardella (Fabricius, 1781)
- Phyllonorycter cavella (Zeller, 1846)
- Phyllonorycter cerasicolella (Herrich-Schäffer, 1855)
- Phyllonorycter cerasinella (Reutti, 1852)
- Phyllonorycter comparella (Duponchel, 1843)
- Phyllonorycter connexella (Zeller, 1846)
- Phyllonorycter coryli (Nicelli, 1851)
- Phyllonorycter corylifoliella (Hübner, 1796)
- Phyllonorycter cydoniella (Denis & Schiffermuller, 1775)
- Phyllonorycter delitella (Duponchel, 1843)
- Phyllonorycter deschkai Triberti, 2007
- Phyllonorycter distentella (Zeller, 1846)
- Phyllonorycter dubitella (Herrich-Schäffer, 1855)
- Phyllonorycter emberizaepenella (Bouche, 1834)
- Phyllonorycter esperella (Goeze, 1783)
- Phyllonorycter fraxinella (Zeller, 1846)
- Phyllonorycter froelichiella (Zeller, 1839)
- Phyllonorycter geniculella (Ragonot, 1874)
- Phyllonorycter harrisella (Linnaeus, 1761)
- Phyllonorycter heegeriella (Zeller, 1846)
- Phyllonorycter helianthemella (Herrich-Schäffer, 1861)
- Phyllonorycter hilarella (Zetterstedt, 1839)
- Phyllonorycter ilicifoliella (Duponchel, 1843)
- Phyllonorycter insignitella (Zeller, 1846)
- Phyllonorycter issikii (Kumata, 1963)
- Phyllonorycter joannisi (Le Marchand, 1936)
- Phyllonorycter junoniella (Zeller, 1846)
- Phyllonorycter klemannella (Fabricius, 1781)
- Phyllonorycter lantanella (Schrank, 1802)
- Phyllonorycter lautella (Zeller, 1846)
- Phyllonorycter leucographella (Zeller, 1850)
- Phyllonorycter maestingella (Muller, 1764)
- Phyllonorycter mannii (Zeller, 1846)
- Phyllonorycter medicaginella (Gerasimov, 1930)
- Phyllonorycter mespilella (Hübner, 1805)
- Phyllonorycter messaniella (Zeller, 1846)
- Phyllonorycter muelleriella (Zeller, 1839)
- Phyllonorycter nicellii (Stainton, 1851)
- Phyllonorycter nigrescentella (Logan, 1851)
- Phyllonorycter oxyacanthae (Frey, 1856)
- Phyllonorycter parisiella (Wocke, 1848)
- Phyllonorycter pastorella (Zeller, 1846)
- Phyllonorycter platani (Staudinger, 1870)
- Phyllonorycter populifoliella (Treitschke, 1833)
- Phyllonorycter pyrifoliella (Gerasimov, 1933)
- Phyllonorycter quercifoliella (Zeller, 1839)
- Phyllonorycter quinqueguttella (Stainton, 1851)
- Phyllonorycter rajella (Linnaeus, 1758)
- Phyllonorycter robiniella (Clemens, 1859)
- Phyllonorycter roboris (Zeller, 1839)
- Phyllonorycter sagitella (Bjerkander, 1790)
- Phyllonorycter salicicolella (Sircom, 1848)
- Phyllonorycter salictella (Zeller, 1846)
- Phyllonorycter scabiosella (Douglas, 1853)
- Phyllonorycter schreberella (Fabricius, 1781)
- Phyllonorycter scitulella (Duponchel, 1843)
- Phyllonorycter sorbi (Frey, 1855)
- Phyllonorycter spinicolella (Zeller, 1846)
- Phyllonorycter staintoniella (Nicelli, 1853)
- Phyllonorycter stettinensis (Nicelli, 1852)
- Phyllonorycter strigulatella (Lienig & Zeller, 1846)
- Phyllonorycter tenerella (de Joannis, 1915)
- Phyllonorycter trifasciella (Haworth, 1828)
- Phyllonorycter tristrigella (Haworth, 1828)
- Phyllonorycter ulmifoliella (Hübner, 1817)
- Phyllonorycter viminetorum (Stainton, 1854)
- Povolnya leucapennella (Stephens, 1835)
- Sauterina hofmanniella (Schleich, 1867)

=== Heliodinidae ===
- Heliodines roesella (Linnaeus, 1758)

=== Heliozelidae ===
- Antispila metallella (Denis & Schiffermuller, 1775)
- Antispila treitschkiella (Fischer von Röslerstamm, 1843)
- Heliozela hammoniella Sorhagen, 1885
- Heliozela resplendella (Stainton, 1851)
- Heliozela sericiella (Haworth, 1828)

=== Hepialidae ===
- Gazoryctra ganna (Hübner, 1808)
- Hepialus humuli (Linnaeus, 1758)
- Pharmacis carna (Denis & Schiffermuller, 1775)
- Pharmacis fusconebulosa (DeGeer, 1778)
- Pharmacis lupulina (Linnaeus, 1758)
- Phymatopus hecta (Linnaeus, 1758)
- Triodia sylvina (Linnaeus, 1761)

=== Incurvariidae ===
- Alloclemensia mesospilella (Herrich-Schäffer, 1854)
- Incurvaria koerneriella (Zeller, 1839)
- Incurvaria masculella (Denis & Schiffermuller, 1775)
- Incurvaria oehlmanniella (Hübner, 1796)
- Incurvaria pectinea Haworth, 1828
- Incurvaria praelatella (Denis & Schiffermuller, 1775)
- Incurvaria triglavensis Hauder, 1912
- Incurvaria vetulella (Zetterstedt, 1839)
- Paraclemensia cyanella (Zeller, 1850)
- Phylloporia bistrigella (Haworth, 1828)

=== Lasiocampidae ===
- Cosmotriche lobulina (Denis & Schiffermuller, 1775)
- Dendrolimus pini (Linnaeus, 1758)
- Eriogaster arbusculae Freyer, 1849
- Eriogaster catax (Linnaeus, 1758)
- Eriogaster lanestris (Linnaeus, 1758)
- Eriogaster rimicola (Denis & Schiffermuller, 1775)
- Euthrix potatoria (Linnaeus, 1758)
- Gastropacha quercifolia (Linnaeus, 1758)
- Gastropacha populifolia (Denis & Schiffermuller, 1775)
- Lasiocampa quercus (Linnaeus, 1758)
- Lasiocampa trifolii (Denis & Schiffermuller, 1775)
- Macrothylacia rubi (Linnaeus, 1758)
- Malacosoma castrensis (Linnaeus, 1758)
- Malacosoma neustria (Linnaeus, 1758)
- Malacosoma alpicola Staudinger, 1870
- Odonestis pruni (Linnaeus, 1758)
- Phyllodesma ilicifolia (Linnaeus, 1758)
- Phyllodesma tremulifolia (Hübner, 1810)
- Poecilocampa alpina (Frey & Wullschlegel, 1874)
- Poecilocampa populi (Linnaeus, 1758)
- Trichiura crataegi (Linnaeus, 1758)

=== Lecithoceridae ===
- Homaloxestis briantiella (Turati, 1879)
- Lecithocera nigrana (Duponchel, 1836)

=== Limacodidae ===
- Apoda limacodes (Hufnagel, 1766)
- Heterogenea asella (Denis & Schiffermuller, 1775)

=== Lyonetiidae ===
- Leucoptera aceris (Fuchs, 1903)
- Leucoptera genistae (M. Hering, 1933)
- Leucoptera heringiella Toll, 1938
- Leucoptera laburnella (Stainton, 1851)
- Leucoptera lotella (Stainton, 1859)
- Leucoptera lustratella (Herrich-Schäffer, 1855)
- Leucoptera malifoliella (O. Costa, 1836)
- Leucoptera onobrychidella Klimesch, 1937
- Leucoptera sinuella (Reutti, 1853)
- Leucoptera spartifoliella (Hübner, 1813)
- Lyonetia clerkella (Linnaeus, 1758)
- Lyonetia ledi Wocke, 1859
- Lyonetia prunifoliella (Hübner, 1796)
- Lyonetia pulverulentella Zeller, 1839
- Phyllobrostis hartmanni Staudinger, 1867

=== Lypusidae ===
- Amphisbatis incongruella (Stainton, 1849)
- Lypusa maurella (Denis & Schiffermuller, 1775)
- Lypusa tokari Elsner, Liska & Petru, 2008
- Pseudatemelia colurnella (Mann, 1867)
- Pseudatemelia flavifrontella (Denis & Schiffermuller, 1775)
- Pseudatemelia latipennella (Jackh, 1959)
- Pseudatemelia subochreella (Doubleday, 1859)
- Pseudatemelia synchrozella (Jackh, 1959)
- Pseudatemelia elsae Svensson, 1982
- Pseudatemelia josephinae (Toll, 1956)

=== Micropterigidae ===
- Micropterix aglaella (Duponchel, 1838)
- Micropterix allionella (Fabricius, 1794)
- Micropterix aruncella (Scopoli, 1763)
- Micropterix aureatella (Scopoli, 1763)
- Micropterix aureoviridella (Hofner, 1898)
- Micropterix calthella (Linnaeus, 1761)
- Micropterix mansuetella Zeller, 1844
- Micropterix myrtetella Zeller, 1850
- Micropterix osthelderi Heath, 1975
- Micropterix paykullella (Fabricius, 1794)
- Micropterix rablensis Zeller, 1868
- Micropterix rothenbachii Frey, 1856
- Micropterix schaefferi Heath, 1975
- Micropterix tunbergella (Fabricius, 1787)

=== Millieridae ===
- Millieria dolosalis (Heydenreich, 1851)

=== Momphidae ===
- Mompha langiella (Hübner, 1796)
- Mompha idaei (Zeller, 1839)
- Mompha miscella (Denis & Schiffermuller, 1775)
- Mompha bradleyi Riedl, 1965
- Mompha confusella Koster & Sinev, 1996
- Mompha conturbatella (Hübner, 1819)
- Mompha divisella Herrich-Schäffer, 1854
- Mompha epilobiella (Denis & Schiffermuller, 1775)
- Mompha lacteella (Stephens, 1834)
- Mompha ochraceella (Curtis, 1839)
- Mompha propinquella (Stainton, 1851)
- Mompha sturnipennella (Treitschke, 1833)
- Mompha subbistrigella (Haworth, 1828)
- Mompha locupletella (Denis & Schiffermuller, 1775)
- Mompha raschkiella (Zeller, 1839)
- Mompha terminella (Humphreys & Westwood, 1845)
