= Phyllonorycter mannii =

Scientific classification
- Kingdom: Animalia
- Phylum: Arthropoda
- Clade: Pancrustacea
- Class: Insecta
- Order: Lepidoptera
- Family: Gracillariidae
- Genus: Phyllonorycter
- Species: P. mannii

Binomial name
- Phyllonorycter mannii (Zeller, 1846)

Synonyms
- Lithocolletis mannii Zeller, 1846

Species of moth

Phyllonorycter mannii is a moth of the family Gracillariidae. It is known from France to Croatia, Hungary and Slovakia and from Bulgaria and the European part of Turkey.

Phyllonorycter mannii is treated as a synonym of Phyllonorycter distentella by many authors.

The larvae feed on Quercus pubescens and Quercus robur. They mine the leaves of their host plant.
