= Iwaruna heringi =

Scientific classification
- Kingdom: Animalia
- Phylum: Arthropoda
- Clade: Pancrustacea
- Class: Insecta
- Order: Lepidoptera
- Family: Gelechiidae
- Genus: Iwaruna
- Species: I. heringi

Binomial name
- Iwaruna heringi Gozmány, 1957

Species of moth

Iwaruna heringi is a moth of the family Gelechiidae. It was described by László Anthony Gozmány in 1957. It is found in Italy.
