= Stenolechiodes macrolepiellus =

Scientific classification
- Kingdom: Animalia
- Phylum: Arthropoda
- Clade: Pancrustacea
- Class: Insecta
- Order: Lepidoptera
- Family: Gelechiidae
- Genus: Stenolechiodes
- Species: S. macrolepiellus

Binomial name
- Stenolechiodes macrolepiellus Huemer & Karsholt, 1999

Species of moth

Stenolechiodes macrolepiellus is a moth of the family Gelechiidae. It is found on Rhodes.

The larvae feed on Quercus macrolepis.
