= Stenolechiodes =

Scientific classification
- Domain: Eukaryota
- Kingdom: Animalia
- Phylum: Arthropoda
- Class: Insecta
- Order: Lepidoptera
- Family: Gelechiidae
- Tribe: Litini
- Genus: Stenolechiodes; Elsner, [1996]

Genus of moths

Stenolechiodes is a genus of moth in the family Gelechiidae.

== Species ==
- Stenolechiodes macrolepiellus Huemer & Karsholt, 1999
- Stenolechiodes pseudogemmellus Elsner, [1996]
