= Iwaruna =

- Iwaruna biguttella

Scientific classification
- Kingdom: Animalia
- Phylum: Arthropoda
- Clade: Pancrustacea
- Class: Insecta
- Order: Lepidoptera
- Family: Gelechiidae
- Tribe: Anacampsini
- Genus: Iwaruna; Gozmány, 1957

Genus of moths

Iwaruna is a genus of moths in the family Gelechiidae.

== Species ==
- Iwaruna biguttella (Duponchel, [1843])
- Iwaruna klimeschi Wolff, 1958
- Iwaruna heringi Gozmány, 1957
- Iwaruna robineaui Nel, 2008

== Former species ==
- Iwaruna biformella (Schütze, 1902)
