= Iwaruna klimeschi =

Scientific classification
- Domain: Eukaryota
- Kingdom: Animalia
- Phylum: Arthropoda
- Class: Insecta
- Order: Lepidoptera
- Family: Gelechiidae
- Genus: Iwaruna
- Species: I. klimeschi

Binomial name
- Iwaruna klimeschi Wolff, 1958

Species of moth

Iwaruna klimeschi is a moth of the family Gelechiidae. It was described by Wolff in 1958. It is found in Austria, Italy, the Czech Republic, Slovakia, Hungary and Romania. Records for France refer to Iwaruna robineaui.
