= Phyllonorycter cavella =

Scientific classification
- Kingdom: Animalia
- Phylum: Arthropoda
- Clade: Pancrustacea
- Class: Insecta
- Order: Lepidoptera
- Family: Gracillariidae
- Genus: Phyllonorycter
- Species: P. cavella

Binomial name
- Phyllonorycter cavella (Zeller, 1846)

Synonyms
- Lithocolletis cavella Zeller, 1846

Species of moth

Phyllonorycter cavella is a moth of the family Gracillariidae. It is known from all of Europe (except Ireland, the Iberian Peninsula, the Balkan Peninsula and the Mediterranean islands), east to Japan and Russia.

The wingspan is 6–9 mm.

The larvae feed on Betula pendula and Betula pubescens. They mine the leaves of their host plant.
