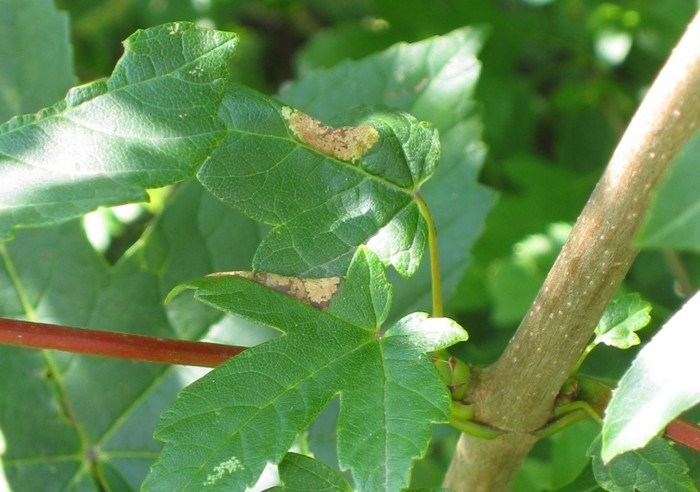
- Larval feeding signs

Scientific classification
- Domain: Eukaryota
- Kingdom: Animalia
- Phylum: Arthropoda
- Class: Insecta
- Order: Lepidoptera
- Family: Gracillariidae
- Genus: Phyllonorycter
- Species: P. geniculella

Binomial name
- Phyllonorycter geniculella (Ragonot, 1874)

Synonyms
- Lithocolletis geniculella Ragonot, 1874

= Phyllonorycter geniculella =

Species of moth

Phyllonorycter geniculella is a moth of the family Gracillariidae. It is found from Sweden to the Pyrenees, Italy and Bulgaria and from Great Britain to southern Russia.

The wingspan is about 8 mm. There are two generations per year with adults on wing in May and again in August.

The larvae feed on sycamore (Acer pseudoplatanus) mining the leaves.
