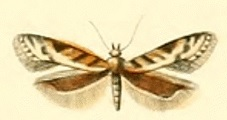

Scientific classification
- Kingdom: Animalia
- Phylum: Arthropoda
- Clade: Pancrustacea
- Class: Insecta
- Order: Lepidoptera
- Family: Gelechiidae
- Genus: Aristotelia
- Species: A. subericinella

Binomial name
- Aristotelia subericinella (Duponchel, 1843)

Synonyms
- Lita subericinella Duponchel, 1843; Aristotelia prohaskaella Rebel, 1907

= Aristotelia subericinella =

Species of moth

Aristotelia subericinella is a moth of the family Gelechiidae. It is found in southern and eastern Europe, The Ural Mountains, Turkey and Central Asia.

The wingspan of Aristotelia subericinella is about 11.5mm.
