= Scrobipalpa hyoscyamella =

Scientific classification
- Kingdom: Animalia
- Phylum: Arthropoda
- Clade: Pancrustacea
- Class: Insecta
- Order: Lepidoptera
- Family: Gelechiidae
- Genus: Scrobipalpa
- Species: S. hyoscyamella

Binomial name
- Scrobipalpa hyoscyamella (Stainton, 1869)

Synonyms
- Lita hyoscyamella Stainton, 1869

Species of moth

Scrobipalpa hyoscyamella is a moth in the family Gelechiidae. It was described by Henry Tibbats Stainton in 1869. It is found in Portugal, Spain, southern France, Austria and Romania.

The forewings are pale ochreous, with a dark grey blotch from the costa, darkest and most sharply defined at its slightly oblique anterior edge. It stops short before the fold and is posteriorly attenuated and gradually shades off into the paler ground-colour. On the disc are two black spots, the anterior of which is in the costal blotch and sometimes surrounded with a pale ring. The pale hinder fascia is very faintly indicated and the apex of the costa and hind margin are spotted with grey, and there is a darker grey (almost black) spot at the extreme apex of the wing.

The larvae feed on Hyoscyamus species and Solanum dulcamara. They are pale greenish grey, with dull reddish dorsal, subdorsal, and lateral lines and a yellowish brown head.
