= Phyllonorycter parisiella =

Scientific classification
- Kingdom: Animalia
- Phylum: Arthropoda
- Clade: Pancrustacea
- Class: Insecta
- Order: Lepidoptera
- Family: Gracillariidae
- Genus: Phyllonorycter
- Species: P. parisiella

Binomial name
- Phyllonorycter parisiella (Wocke, 1848)

Synonyms
- Lithocolletis parisiella Wocke, 1848

Species of moth

Phyllonorycter parisiella is a moth of the family Gracillariidae. It is found from the Czech Republic and Slovakia to the Pyrenees, Sardinia, Italy and North Macedonia and from France to Romania.

The larvae feed on Quercus pubescens. They mine the leaves of their host plant.
