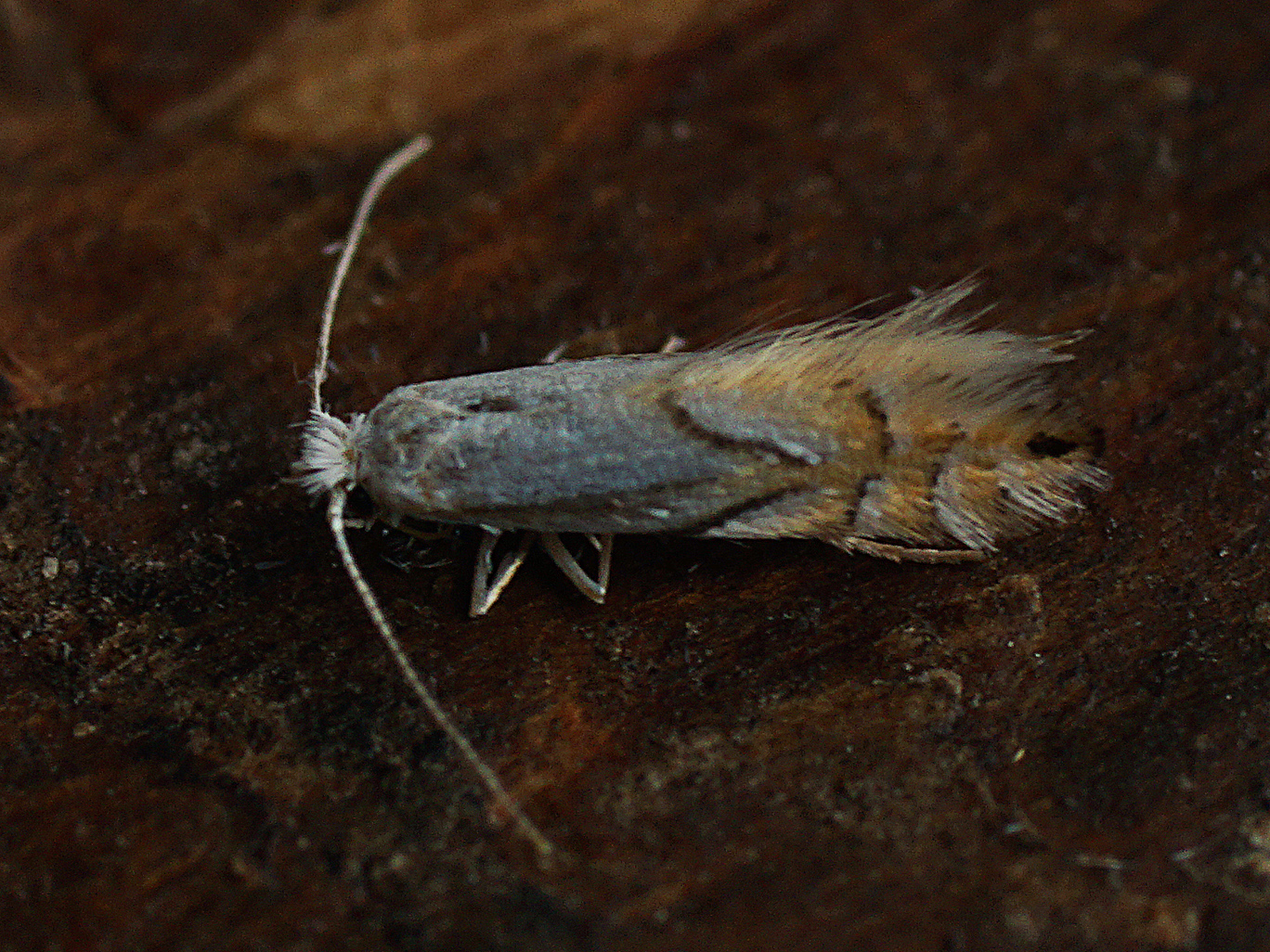
- Imago New Forest, Hampshire, England
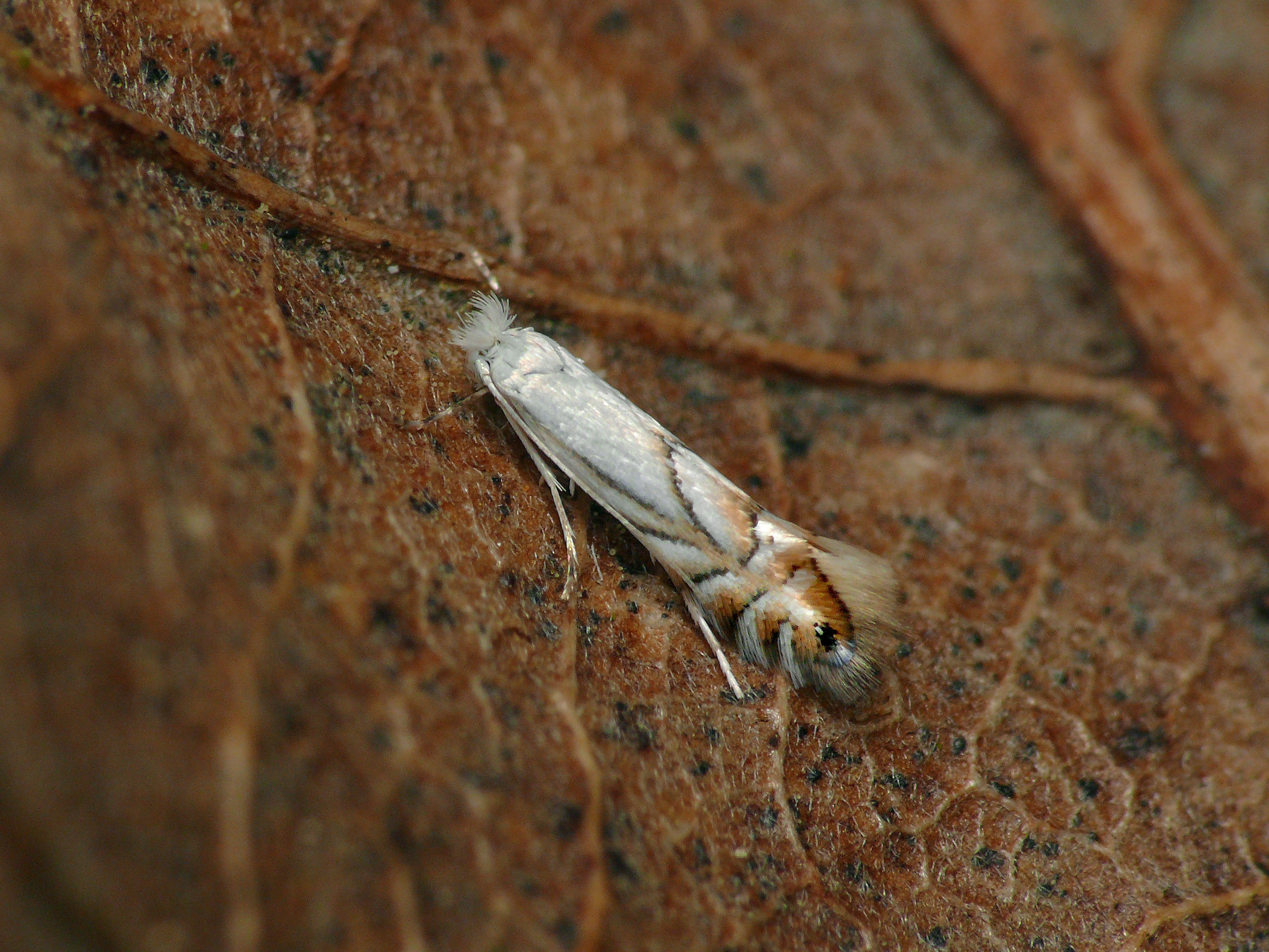
- Imago Russia, Moscow Oblast

Scientific classification
- Domain: Eukaryota
- Kingdom: Animalia
- Phylum: Arthropoda
- Class: Insecta
- Order: Lepidoptera
- Family: Gracillariidae
- Genus: Phyllonorycter
- Species: P. heegeriella

Binomial name
- Phyllonorycter heegeriella (Zeller, 1846)

Synonyms
- Lithocolletis heegeriella Zeller, 1846

= Phyllonorycter heegeriella =

Species of moth

Phyllonorycter heegeriella is a moth of the family Gracillariidae. It is found in all of Europe, except the Iberian Peninsula and the Balkan Peninsula.

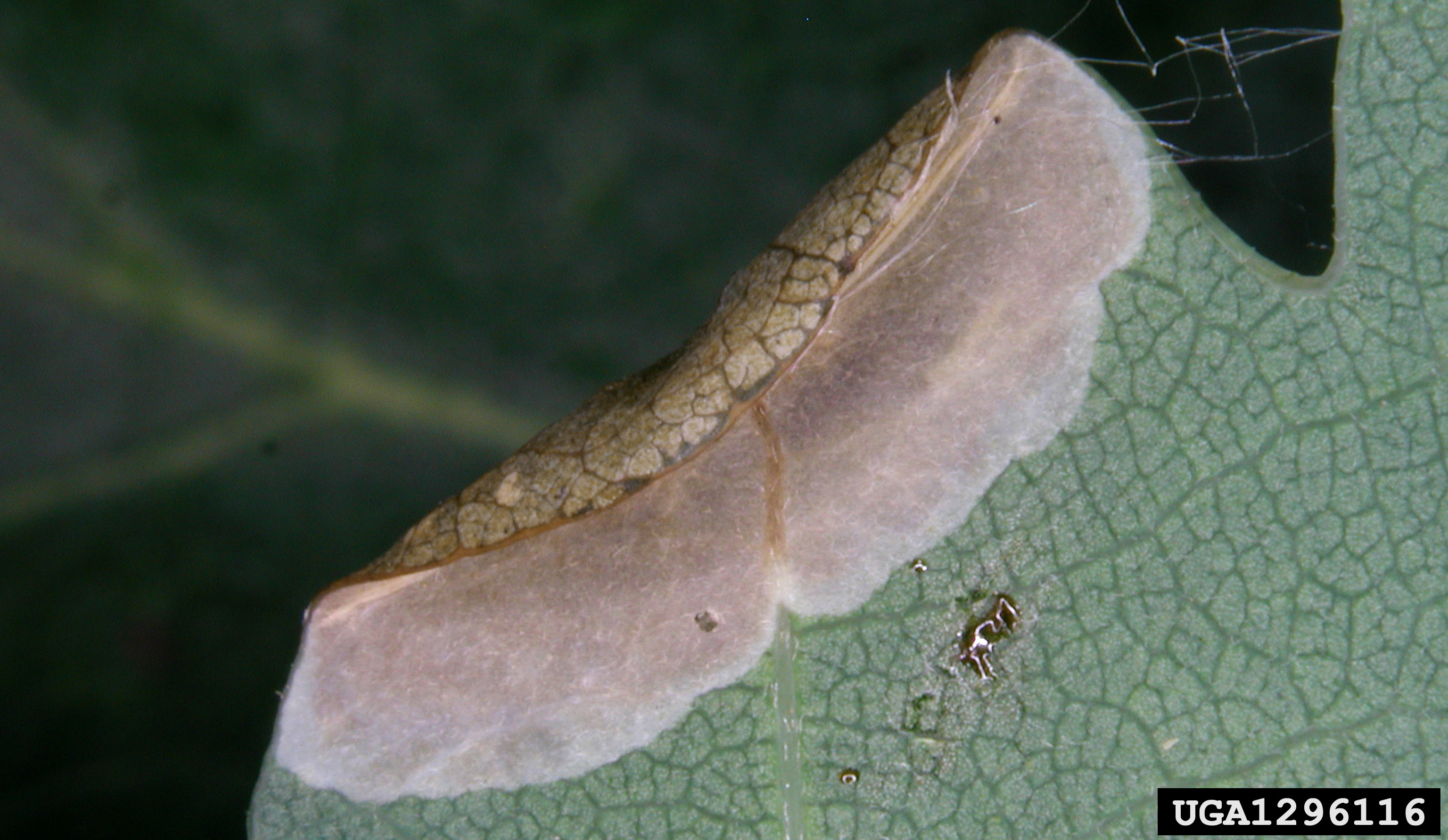
leaf mine

The wingspan is 6,5-8,5 mm. The forewings are shining white; a fuscous median line from base to middle; four costal and three dorsal dark fuscous strigulae, anteriorly more or less broadly margined with pale yellow-ochreous; apex pale yellow-ochreous, enclosing an elongate black apical dot; an ill-defined dark hook in apical cilia. Hindwings pale grey.

Adults are on wing in May and August in two generations in western Europe.

The larvae feed on Quercus petraea and Quercus robur. They mine the leaves of their host plant.
