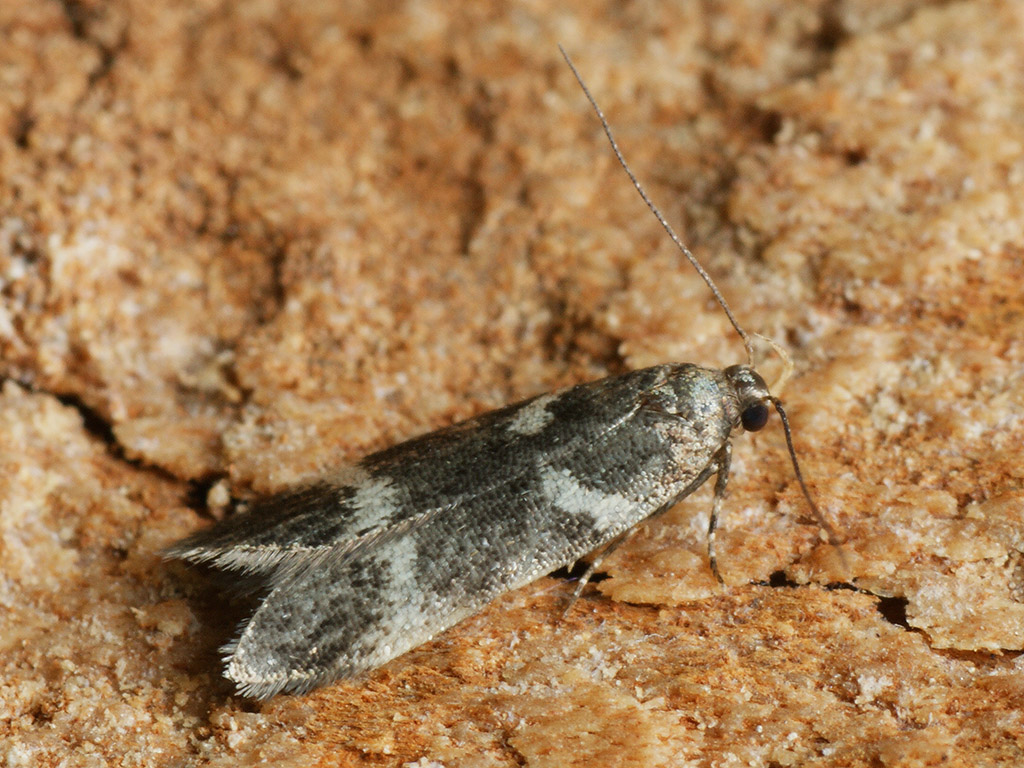

Scientific classification
- Kingdom: Animalia
- Phylum: Arthropoda
- Clade: Pancrustacea
- Class: Insecta
- Order: Lepidoptera
- Family: Gelechiidae
- Genus: Chionodes
- Species: C. lugubrella

Binomial name
- Chionodes lugubrella (Fabricius, 1794)

Synonyms
- Tinea lugubrella Fabricius, 1794; Tinea luctificella Hubner 1813; Lita lunatella Zetterstedt, 1839

= Chionodes lugubrella =

Species of moth

Chionodes lugubrella is a moth of the family Gelechiidae. The geographical distribution of this species extends throughout Europe (species not found in Ireland, Great Britain, the Benelux, the Iberian Peninsula, the Balkan Peninsula, Slovakia and Ukraine), into the Caucasus, Siberia and the Russian Far East. It is also found in North America.

The wingspan is 14–18 mm. Adults moths in Sweden are in flight from June to August.

The larvae feed on Dorycnium pentaphyllum, Trifolium repens, Vicia cracca and Lotus species.
