= Phyllonorycter deschkai =

Scientific classification
- Kingdom: Animalia
- Phylum: Arthropoda
- Clade: Pancrustacea
- Class: Insecta
- Order: Lepidoptera
- Family: Gracillariidae
- Genus: Phyllonorycter
- Species: P. deschkai

Binomial name
- Phyllonorycter deschkai Triberti, 2007

Species of moth

Phyllonorycter deschkai is a moth of the family Gracillariidae. It is known from Alps on altitudes between 500 and 1,750 meters.

There are two generations per year. The larvae feed on Amelanchier ovalis, Cotoneaster integerrimus, Cotoneaster nebrodensis, Sorbus aria and Sorbus chamaemespilus. They mine the leaves of their host plant.
