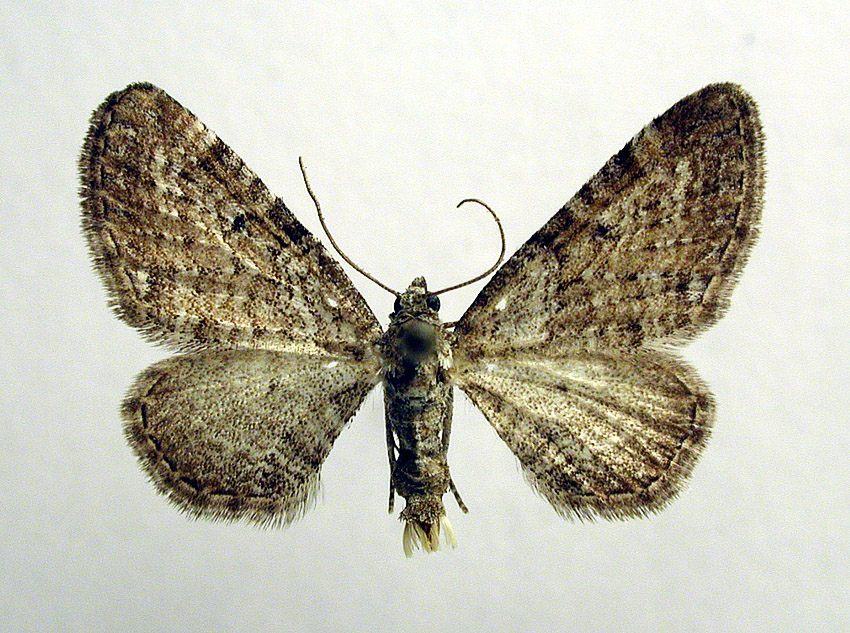

Scientific classification
- Domain: Eukaryota
- Kingdom: Animalia
- Phylum: Arthropoda
- Class: Insecta
- Order: Lepidoptera
- Family: Geometridae
- Genus: Eupithecia
- Species: E. pernotata

Binomial name
- Eupithecia pernotata Guenée, 1857

Synonyms
- Eupithecia antaggregata Inoue, 1977; Eupithecia enictata Pellmyr & Mikkola, 1984; Eupithecia fuscostigma Alpheraky, 1892; Eupithecia aggregata Guenée, 1857

= Eupithecia pernotata =

Species of moth

Eupithecia pernotata, or Guenée's pug, is a moth of the family Geometridae. The species was first described by Achille Guenée in 1857. It is known from the Alps, through Romania to southern Russia. It is also found in Finland.

The wingspan is 18–19 mm. There is one generation per year with adults on wing from mid-June to mid-July.

The larvae feed on Tanacetum vulgare, Artemisia vulgaris, Artemisia campestris and Pimpinella saxifraga. Larvae can be found from June to mid-September. It overwinters as a pupa in the ground.

== Subspecies ==
- Eupithecia pernotata pernotata
- Eupithecia pernotata enictata Pellmyr & Mikkola, 1984

== Taxonomy ==
Eupithecia antaggregata was treated as a synonym by Vladimir G. Mironov in 2003.
