= Chionodes hayreddini =

Scientific classification
- Kingdom: Animalia
- Phylum: Arthropoda
- Clade: Pancrustacea
- Class: Insecta
- Order: Lepidoptera
- Family: Gelechiidae
- Genus: Chionodes
- Species: C. hayreddini

Binomial name
- Chionodes hayreddini Koçak, 1986

Synonyms
- Gelechia ochripalpella Frey, 1880 (preocc.)

Species of moth

Chionodes hayreddini is a moth of the family Gelechiidae. It is found in Austria, Switzerland, Italy, Bulgaria and Romania.
