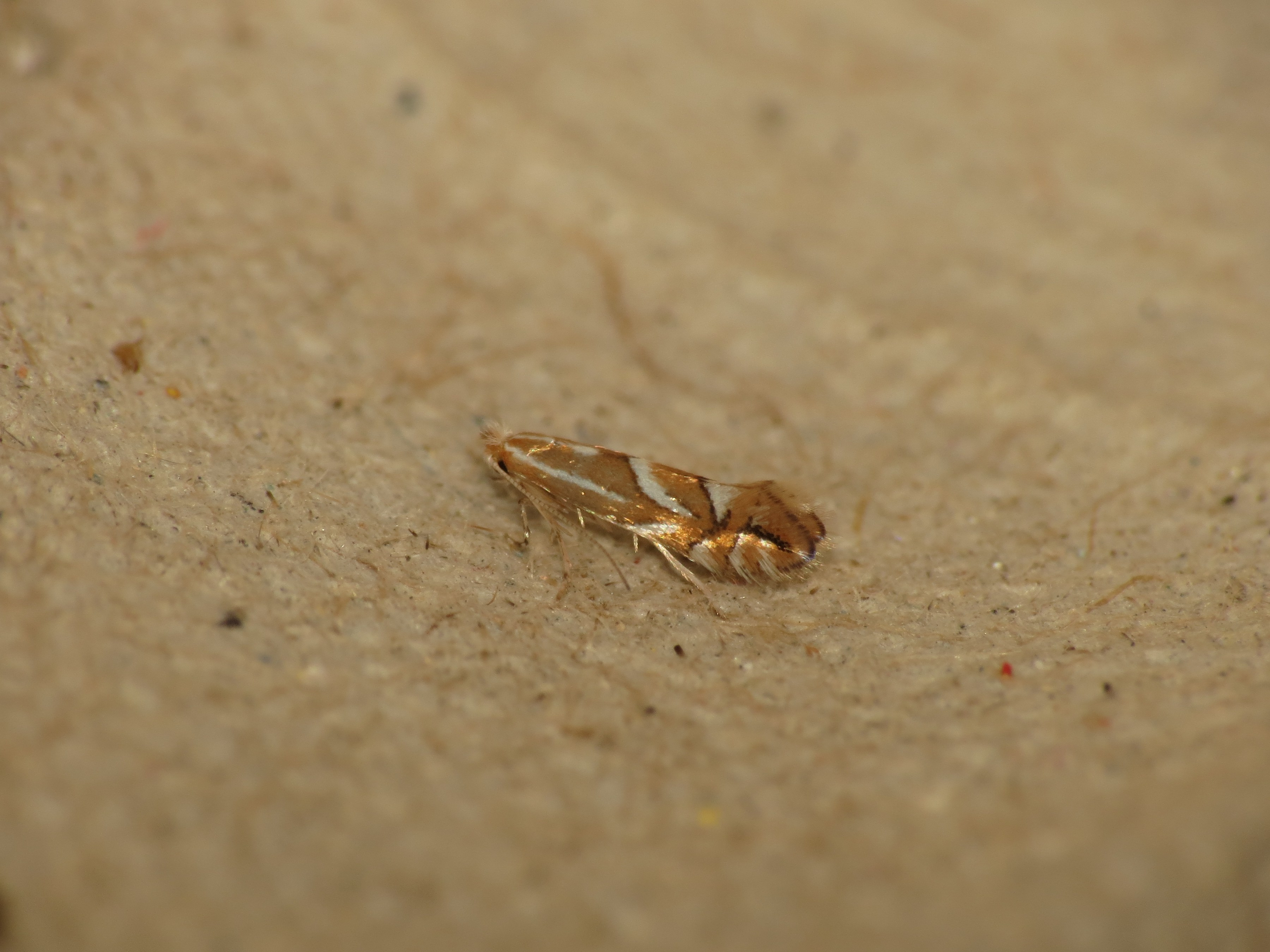
- '

Scientific classification
- Domain: Eukaryota
- Kingdom: Animalia
- Phylum: Arthropoda
- Class: Insecta
- Order: Lepidoptera
- Family: Gracillariidae
- Genus: Phyllonorycter
- Species: P. dubitella

Binomial name
- Phyllonorycter dubitella (Herrich-Schaffer, 1855)

Synonyms
- Lithocolletis dubitella Herrich-Schaffer, 1855

= Phyllonorycter dubitella =

Species of moth

Phyllonorycter dubitella is a moth of the family Gracillariidae. It is found from Fennoscandia and northern Russia to the Pyrenees, Italy and Bulgaria and from Great Britain to Ukraine.

The wingspan is about 8 mm. There are two generations per year with adults on wing in May and June and again in August.

The larvae feed on Salix caprea. They mine the leaves of their host plant.
