= Iwaruna biguttella =

Scientific classification
- Domain: Eukaryota
- Kingdom: Animalia
- Phylum: Arthropoda
- Class: Insecta
- Order: Lepidoptera
- Family: Gelechiidae
- Genus: Iwaruna
- Species: I. biguttella

Binomial name
- Iwaruna biguttella (Duponchel, [1843])

Synonyms
- Lita biguttella Duponchel, [1843]

Species of moth

Iwaruna biguttella is a moth of the family Gelechiidae. It was described by Philogène Auguste Joseph Duponchel in 1843. It is found in Portugal, Spain, France, on Sardinia, Italy, Austria, Switzerland, Croatia, Romania, Ukraine, Russia and Asia Minor.
