= Scrobipalpa stangei =

Scientific classification
- Domain: Eukaryota
- Kingdom: Animalia
- Phylum: Arthropoda
- Class: Insecta
- Order: Lepidoptera
- Family: Gelechiidae
- Genus: Scrobipalpa
- Species: S. stangei

Binomial name
- Scrobipalpa stangei (Hering, 1889)

Synonyms
- Gelechia stangei Hering, 1889; Lita saltenella Mees, 1910

Species of moth

Scrobipalpa stangei is a moth in the family Gelechiidae. It was described by Hering in 1889. It is found in Great Britain, northern Germany, Denmark, southern Scandinavia, Poland, Estonia, Latvia, Austria and Hungary.

Its wingspan ranges from 13–15 mm (0.51–0.59 in).

The larvae feed on Triglochin maritima and Triglochin palustris. They mine the leaves of their host plant in autumn. The mine has the form of a broad, transparent, full depth gallery. They overwinter in the rhizome, and bore in the rhizome or stem in spring. Pupation takes place outside of the mine.
