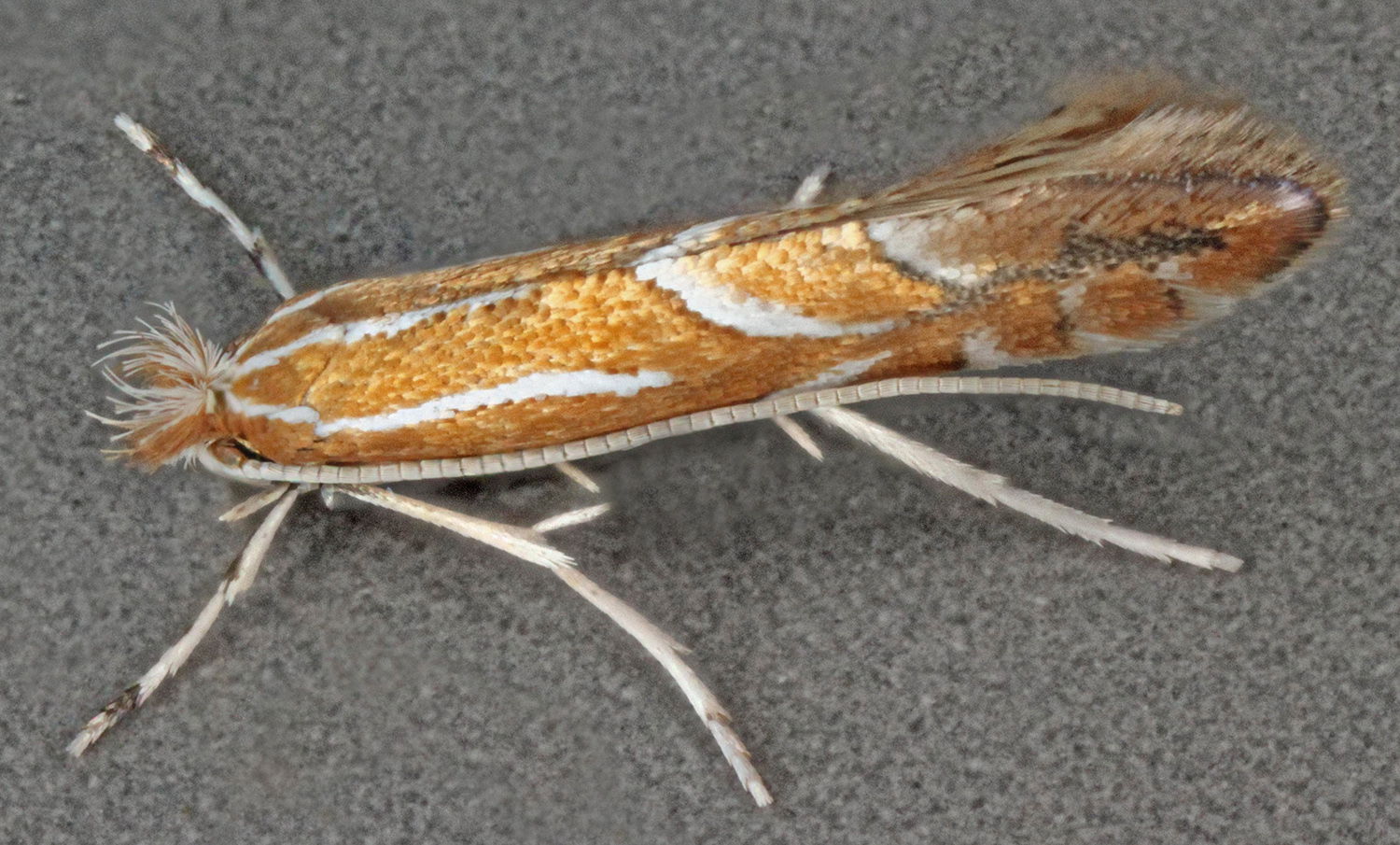
- Phyllonorycter leucographella, Dolgellau, North Wales

Scientific classification
- Domain: Eukaryota
- Kingdom: Animalia
- Phylum: Arthropoda
- Class: Insecta
- Order: Lepidoptera
- Family: Gracillariidae
- Genus: Phyllonorycter
- Species: P. leucographella

Binomial name
- Phyllonorycter leucographella (Zeller, 1850)

Synonyms
- Lithocolletis leucographella Zeller, 1850

= Phyllonorycter leucographella =

Species of moth

The firethorn leaf miner (Phyllonorycter leucographella) is a moth of the family Gracillariidae. It is native to southern Europe (Mediterranean regions of France, Spain, Greece, Albania, Russia (Crimea), Turkey, and the southern part of former Yugoslavia where its principal host plant is native) and was probably introduced accidentally into several countries in western Europe on transported plant material. It has now been recorded as far north as Finland and east to Hungary. It was first recorded in Great Britain in 1989. Nash et al. (1995) studied the spread of this species in Great Britain. Besides the "natural" spread of the insect, they found several foci of colonization outside the main distribution range that were undoubtedly due to human activities.

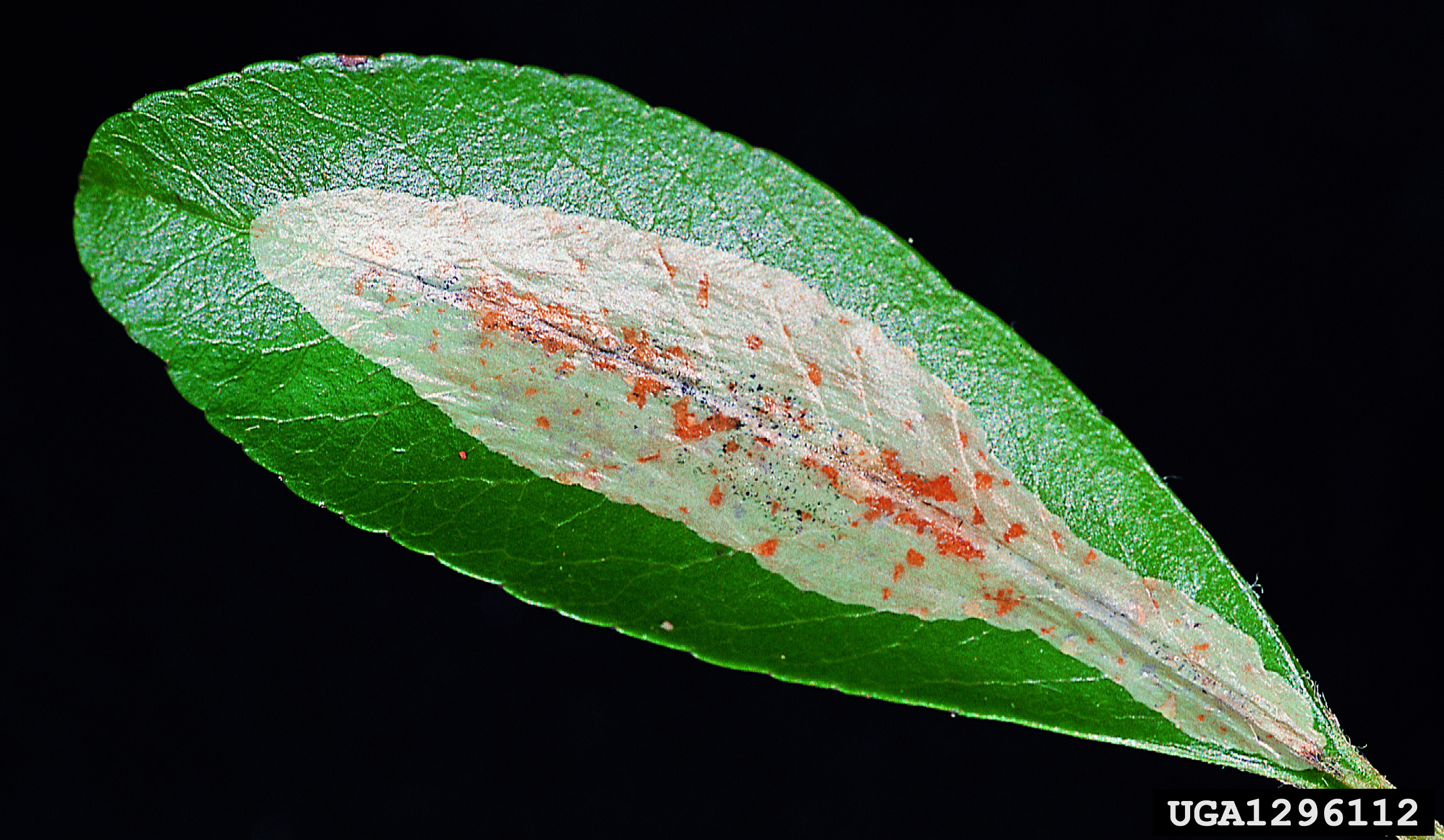
Damage
