= Phyllonorycter connexella =

Scientific classification
- Kingdom: Animalia
- Phylum: Arthropoda
- Clade: Pancrustacea
- Class: Insecta
- Order: Lepidoptera
- Family: Gracillariidae
- Genus: Phyllonorycter
- Species: P. connexella

Binomial name
- Phyllonorycter connexella (Zeller, 1846)

Synonyms
- Lithocolletis connexella Zeller, 1846

Species of moth

Phyllonorycter connexella is a moth of the family Gracillariidae. It is found from Fennoscandia to the Pyrenees and Italy and from France to central Russia and Ukraine.

The larvae feed on Populus alba, Populus x canadensis, P. nigra (including its cultivar, 'Italica'), Salix alba, Salix x fragilis, S. pentandra and S. purpurea. They mine the leaves of their host plant.
