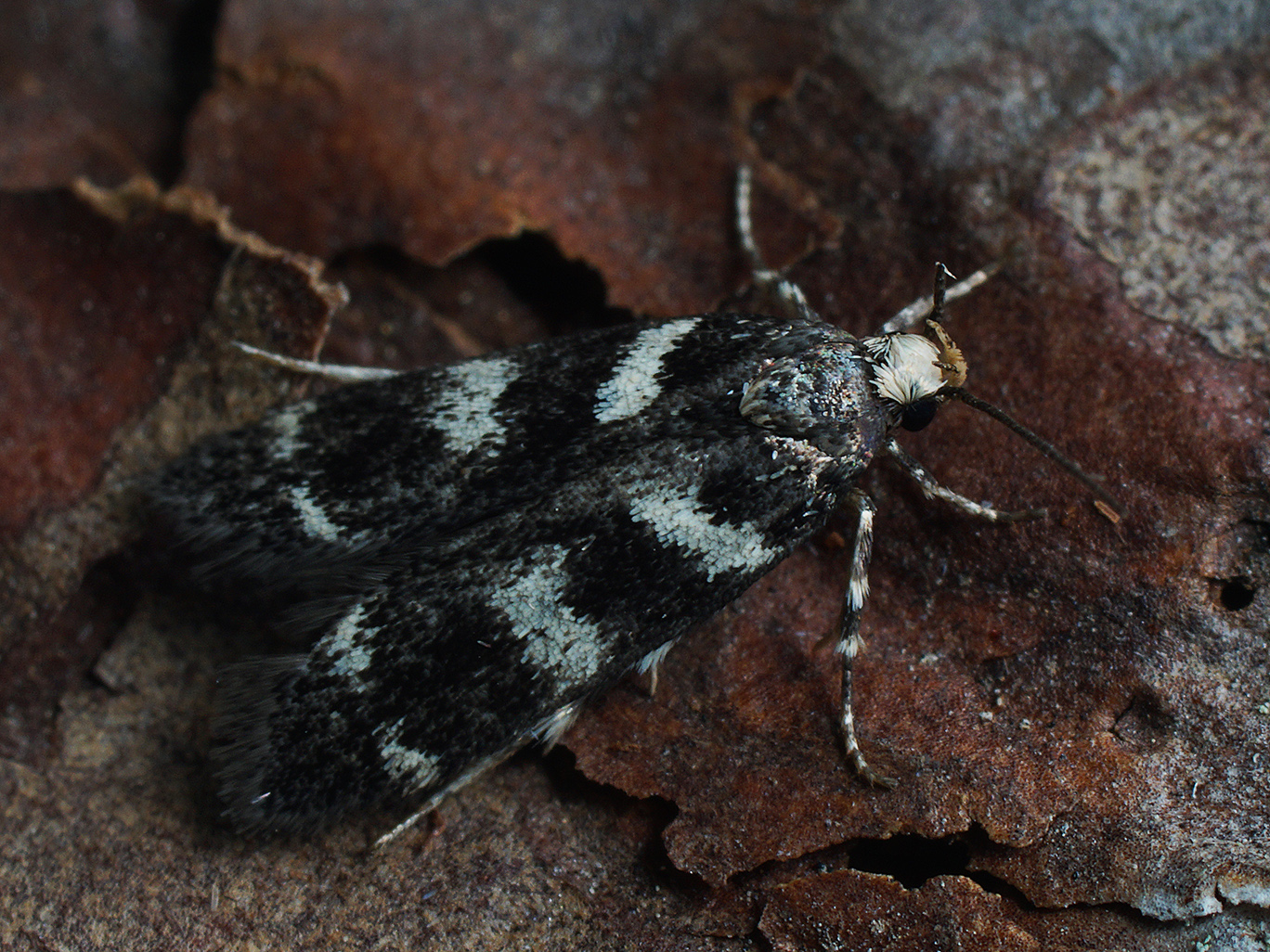

Scientific classification
- Kingdom: Animalia
- Phylum: Arthropoda
- Clade: Pancrustacea
- Class: Insecta
- Order: Lepidoptera
- Family: Gelechiidae
- Genus: Chionodes
- Species: C. luctuella

Binomial name
- Chionodes luctuella (Hübner, 1793)

Synonyms
- Phalaena luctuella Hübner, 1793

= Chionodes luctuella =

Species of moth

Chionodes luctuella is a moth of the family Gelechiidae. It is found in Norway, Sweden, Finland, Denmark, Germany, Austria, Switzerland, Italy, the Czech Republic, Slovakia, Poland, Hungary, Romania, Estonia, Latvia, Ukraine and Russia.

The wingspan is 13–15 mm. Adults have been recorded on wing from June to August.

The larvae feed on Picea abies.
