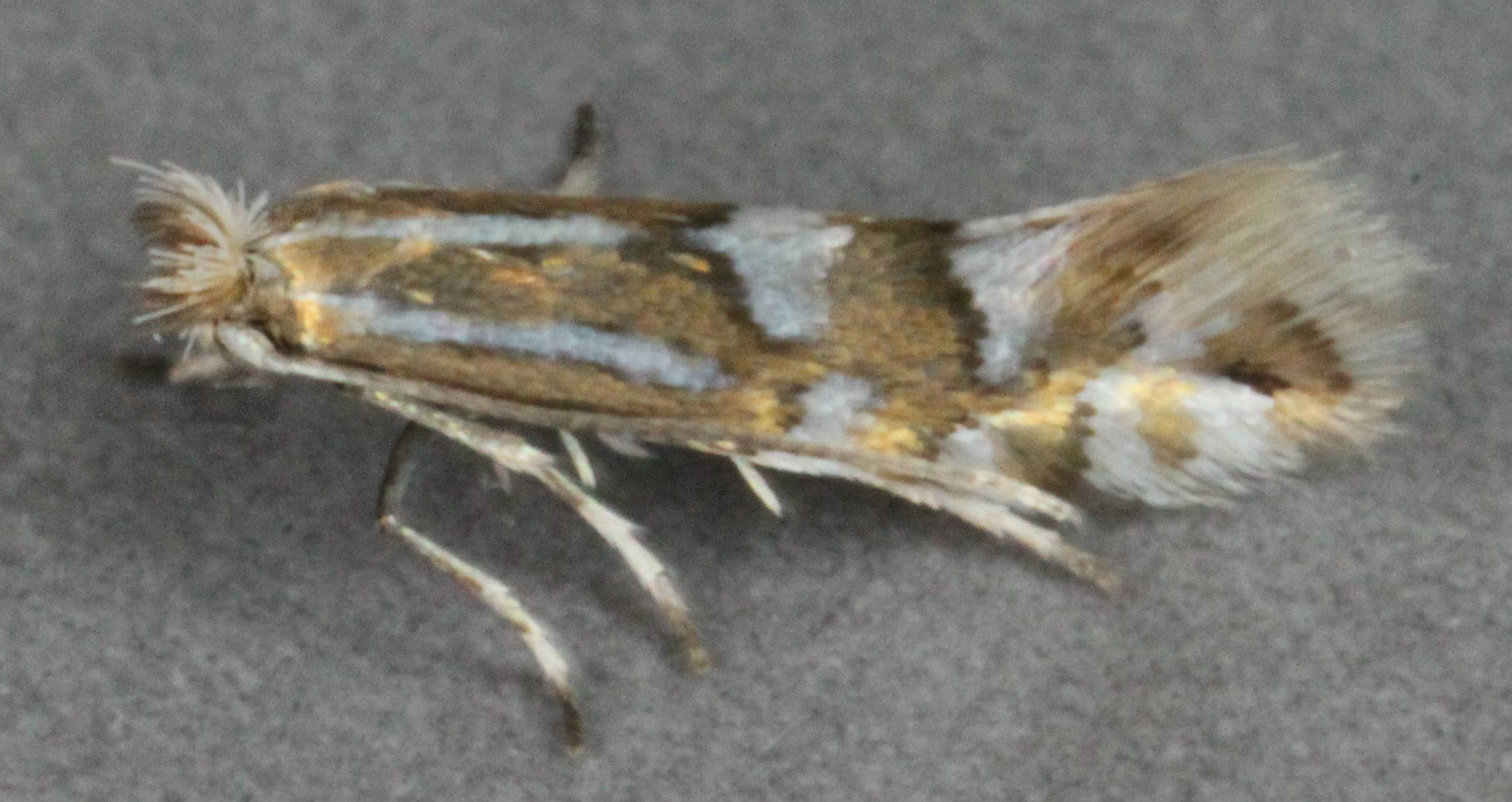

Scientific classification
- Kingdom: Animalia
- Phylum: Arthropoda
- Clade: Pancrustacea
- Class: Insecta
- Order: Lepidoptera
- Family: Gracillariidae
- Genus: Phyllonorycter
- Species: P. quinqueguttella

Binomial name
- Phyllonorycter quinqueguttella (Stainton, 1851)

Synonyms
- Lithocolletis quinqueguttella Stainton, 1851

= Phyllonorycter quinqueguttella =

Species of moth

Phyllonorycter quinqueguttella is a moth of the family Gracillariidae. It is found from Fennoscandia to the Pyrenees, Alps, Hungary and Ukraine and from Ireland to central Russia.

The wingspan is 6-7.5 mm. The forewings are golden ochreous; a white median streak from base to near middle, dark -margined above; a white posteriorly dilated dark-edged streak along costa from near base to 2/5; four costal and three dorsal shining white anteriorly dark-margined triangular spots, first dorsal short, a blackish apical dot. Hindwings are grey.

There are two generations per year with adults on wing in May and again in August

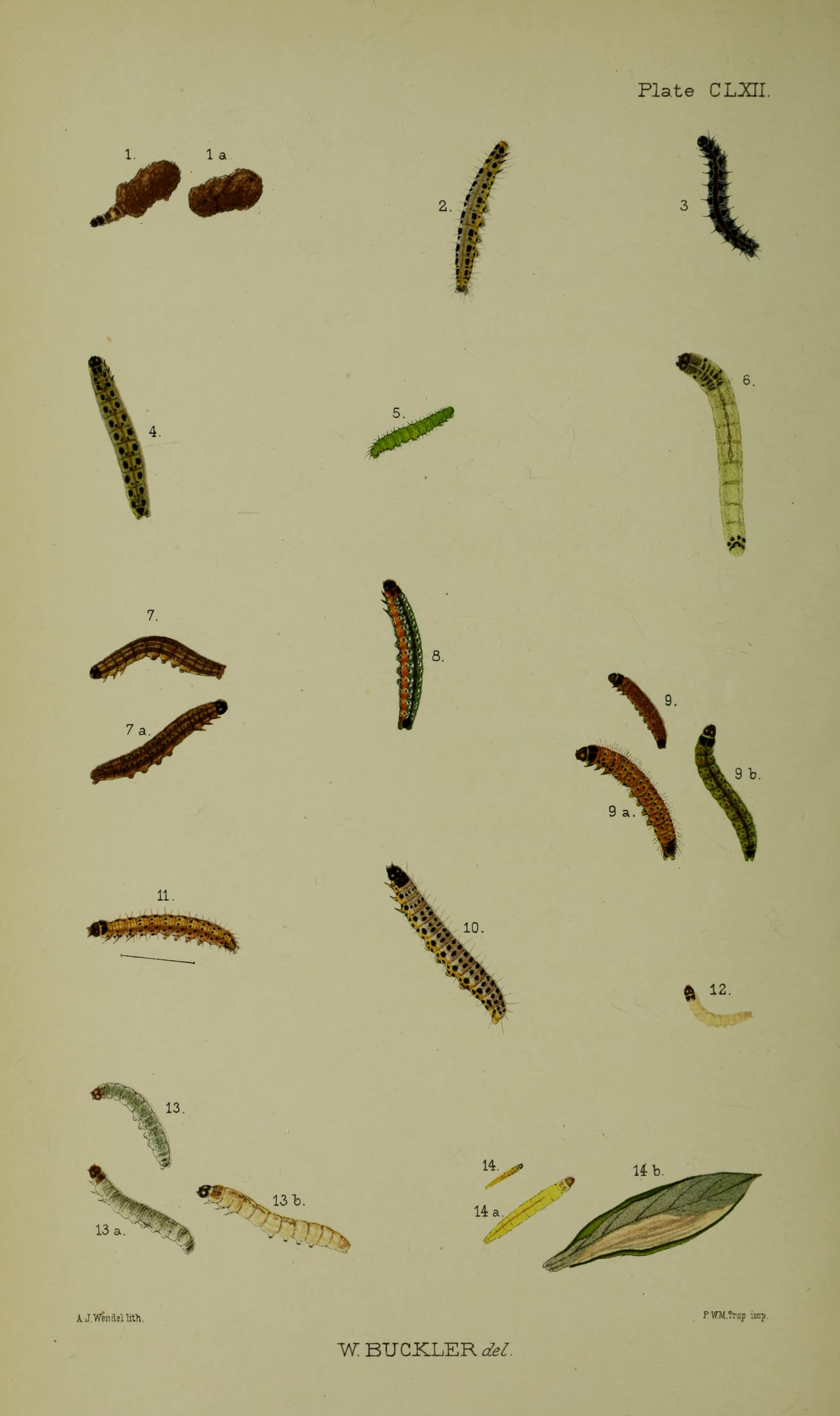
Figs. 14, 14a larvae in various stages of growth 14b mine in leaf

The larvae feed on Salix repens. They mine the leaves of their host plant.
