= Scrobipalpa rebeli =

Scientific classification
- Domain: Eukaryota
- Kingdom: Animalia
- Phylum: Arthropoda
- Class: Insecta
- Order: Lepidoptera
- Family: Gelechiidae
- Genus: Scrobipalpa
- Species: S. rebeli

Binomial name
- Scrobipalpa rebeli (Preissecker, 1914)

Synonyms
- Gelechia rebeli Preissecker, 1914; Euscrobipalpa japonica Povolný, 1977; Lita rebeli var. fuscella Klimesch, 1938

Species of moth

Scrobipalpa rebeli is a moth of the family Gelechiidae. It is found in Austria, Italy, Ukraine and the Krasnoyarsk region in southern Siberia. It is also present in China (Shaanxi) and Japan.

The wingspan is about 11.5 mm (0.45 in).

The larvae feed on Artemisia campestris.

== Subspecies ==
- Scrobipalpa rebeli rebeli
- Scrobipalpa rebeli fuscella Klimesch, 1938
