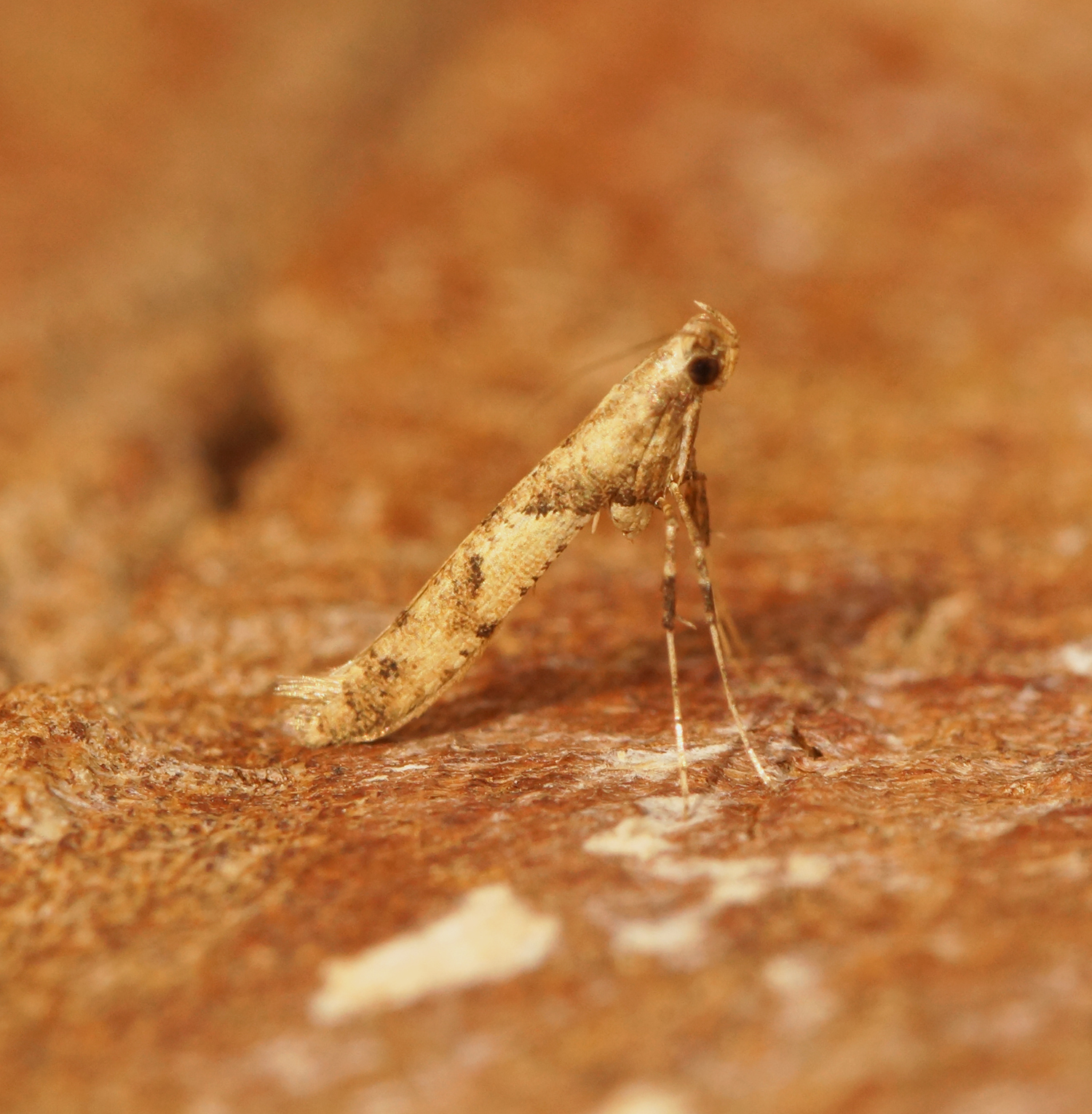

Scientific classification
- Domain: Eukaryota
- Kingdom: Animalia
- Phylum: Arthropoda
- Class: Insecta
- Order: Lepidoptera
- Family: Gracillariidae
- Genus: Caloptilia
- Species: C. honoratella

Binomial name
- Caloptilia honoratella (Rebel, 1914)

Synonyms
- Gracilaria honoratella Rebel, 1914

= Caloptilia honoratella =

Species of moth

Caloptilia honoratella is a moth of the family Gracillariidae. It is known from Austria, Belgium, Hungary, Iberia, Italy, the Netherlands and North Macedonia. The first British record, found in Cheriton, Kent was confirmed by examining the genitalia in April 2019.
