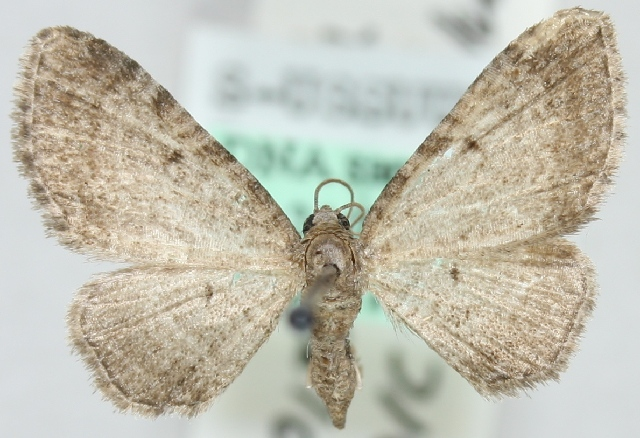

Scientific classification
- Domain: Eukaryota
- Kingdom: Animalia
- Phylum: Arthropoda
- Class: Insecta
- Order: Lepidoptera
- Family: Geometridae
- Genus: Eupithecia
- Species: E. addictata

Binomial name
- Eupithecia addictata Dietze, 1908

Synonyms
- Eupithecia danielata Schutze, 1959; Eupithecia falkovitshi Viidalepp, 1976; Eupithecia koreaica Vojnits & Laever, 1978; Eupithecia pseudoplumbeolata Vojnits, 1973; Eupithecia rudniki Vojnits, 1973

= Eupithecia addictata =

Species of geometer moth

Eupithecia addictata is a moth in the family Geometridae. It is found from north-eastern Italy, through Austria, northern Hungary and southern Slovakia to Ukraine, Russia and Japan. It is also found in the southern Balkan Peninsula (including North Macedonia, Greece and probably also Bulgaria).

The wingspan is about 18 mm. Adults are on wing from mid June to the beginning of August.

The larvae feed on Thalictrum species, including Thalictrum minus und Thalictrum foetidum. The species overwinters in the pupal stage.
