= Stenolechiodes pseudogemmellus =

Scientific classification
- Domain: Eukaryota
- Kingdom: Animalia
- Phylum: Arthropoda
- Class: Insecta
- Order: Lepidoptera
- Family: Gelechiidae
- Genus: Stenolechiodes
- Species: S. pseudogemmellus

Binomial name
- Stenolechiodes pseudogemmellus Elsner, 1996

Species of moth

Stenolechiodes pseudogemmellus is a moth of the family Gelechiidae. It is known from Germany, Greece, Italy, Austria, Poland, Slovakia, the Czech Republic, Turkey, France, Belgium, the Netherlands and Croatia.

The wingspan is 8–10 mm. Adults are on wing from the end of April to the start of July in one generation in central Europe. In south-eastern Europe, there is probably a second generation since adults were also collected in July in Italy, Greece and Montenegro.

The larvae feed on Quercus species, including Quercus robur. They feed in the young shoots.
