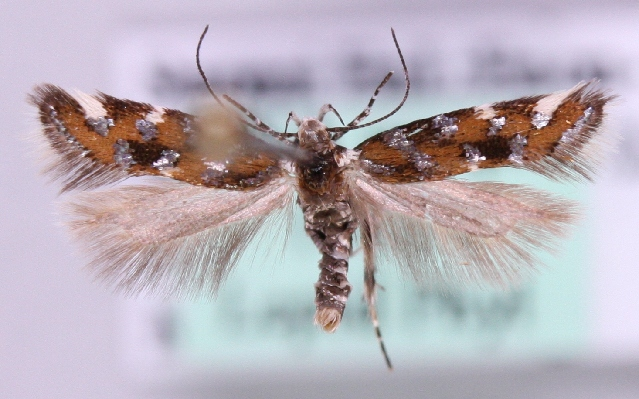

Scientific classification
- Kingdom: Animalia
- Phylum: Arthropoda
- Clade: Pancrustacea
- Class: Insecta
- Order: Lepidoptera
- Family: Gelechiidae
- Genus: Aristotelia
- Species: A. heliacella

Binomial name
- Aristotelia heliacella (Herrich-Schäffer, 1854)

Synonyms
- Anacampsis heliacella Herrich-Schäffer, 1854; Ergatis rogenhoferi Staudinger, 1872

= Aristotelia heliacella =

Species of moth

Aristotelia heliacella is a moth of the family Gelechiidae. It is found in France, Switzerland, Austria, Germany, Italy, Finland, Norway and Sweden.

The wingspan is 10–11 mm. Adults have been recorded on wing from June to August.

The larvae feed on Dryas octopetala.
