= Glyphipterix gianelliella =

Scientific classification
- Kingdom: Animalia
- Phylum: Arthropoda
- Clade: Pancrustacea
- Class: Insecta
- Order: Lepidoptera
- Family: Glyphipterigidae
- Genus: Glyphipterix
- Species: G. gianelliella

Binomial name
- Glyphipterix gianelliella Ragonot, 1885

Species of moth

Glyphipterix gianelliella is a moth of the family Glyphipterigidae. It is found in France, Spain, Switzerland, Austria, Italy and the Caucasus.

The wingspan is about 14 mm.
