= Chionodes holosericella =

Scientific classification
- Kingdom: Animalia
- Phylum: Arthropoda
- Clade: Pancrustacea
- Class: Insecta
- Order: Lepidoptera
- Family: Gelechiidae
- Genus: Chionodes
- Species: C. holosericella

Binomial name
- Chionodes holosericella (Herrich-Schäffer, 1854)

Synonyms
- Gelechia holosericella Herrich-Schäffer, 1854; Gelechia norvegiae Strand, 1903; Gelechia cognatella Heinemann, 1870; Gelechia dovrella Grønlien, 1925; Gelechia meesi Barca, 1932; Gelechia danieli Osthelder, 1951

Species of moth

Chionodes holosericella (or Gelechia danieli) is a moth of the family Gelechiidae. It is found in Norway, Sweden, Finland, Latvia, Estonia, France, Germany, Austria, Italy, Croatia, Slovakia, Ukraine and Russia. Outside of Europe, it is found in the Caucasus, from Siberia to the Magadan Oblast and in South Korea.

The wingspan of Chionodes holosericella is 15–18 mm. Adults have been recorded on wing from June to August.
