= Phyllonorycter scitulella =

Scientific classification
- Domain: Eukaryota
- Kingdom: Animalia
- Phylum: Arthropoda
- Class: Insecta
- Order: Lepidoptera
- Family: Gracillariidae
- Genus: Phyllonorycter
- Species: P. scitulella

Binomial name
- Phyllonorycter scitulella (Duponchel, 1843)

Synonyms
- Lithocolletis scitulella Duponchel, 1843

Species of moth

Phyllonorycter scitulella is a moth of the family Gracillariidae. It is found from the Czech Republic to Portugal, Italy and Greece and from France to Ukraine.

The larvae feed on Quercus pubescens. They mine the leaves of their host plant.
