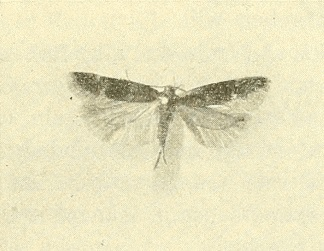

Scientific classification
- Kingdom: Animalia
- Phylum: Arthropoda
- Clade: Pancrustacea
- Class: Insecta
- Order: Lepidoptera
- Family: Gelechiidae
- Genus: Scrobipalpa
- Species: S. feralella

Binomial name
- Scrobipalpa feralella (Zeller, 1872)

Synonyms
- Gelechia feralella Zeller, 1872; Gelechia rebeliella Hauder, 1917

= Scrobipalpa feralella =

Species of moth

Scrobipalpa feralella is a moth in the family Gelechiidae. It was described by Zeller in 1872. It is found in Austria, Switzerland and northern Italy.

The wingspan is 12–14 mm (0.47–0.55 in). The forewings are dark brown. The hindwings are lighter and lightly glossy.
