= Chionodes praeclarella =

Scientific classification
- Kingdom: Animalia
- Phylum: Arthropoda
- Clade: Pancrustacea
- Class: Insecta
- Order: Lepidoptera
- Family: Gelechiidae
- Genus: Chionodes
- Species: C. praeclarella

Binomial name
- Chionodes praeclarella (Herrich-Schäffer, 1854)

Synonyms
- Gelechia praeclarella Herrich-Schäffer, 1854; Gelechia pergrandella Rebel 1917; Gelechia labradorica Möschler, 1864; Gelechia fluvialella Busck, 1908

Species of moth

Chionodes praeclarella is a moth of the family Gelechiidae. It is found in most of North America. It also is found in Europe, where the range is limited to Austria, Switzerland and Italy.

The wingspan is 18–20 mm. The forewings are light brown, with a strong purplish sheen, especially towards the apex. The exterior edge of the cell and the apical veins are roughly indicated by ill-defined, purplish-black longitudinal lines, more or less confluent towards the apex. The hindwings are light fuscous.

The larvae have been recorded feeding on Polygonaceae species.
