= Scrobipalpa arenbergeri =

Scientific classification
- Kingdom: Animalia
- Phylum: Arthropoda
- Clade: Pancrustacea
- Class: Insecta
- Order: Lepidoptera
- Family: Gelechiidae
- Genus: Scrobipalpa
- Species: S. arenbergeri

Binomial name
- Scrobipalpa arenbergeri Povolný, 1973

Synonyms
- Scrobipalpa (Euscrobipalpa) arenbergeri Povolný, 1973

Species of moth

Scrobipalpa arenbergeri is a moth in the family Gelechiidae. It was described by Povolný in 1973. It is found in Austria, Hungary, the Czech Republic, Slovakia, Croatia, Italy, Ukraine, the southern Ural Mountains and Transbaikal.

The length of the forewings is 5–5.2 mm (0.20–0.20 in).

The larvae possibly feed on Centaurea scabiosa.
