= Scrobipalpa halonella =

Scientific classification
- Domain: Eukaryota
- Kingdom: Animalia
- Phylum: Arthropoda
- Class: Insecta
- Order: Lepidoptera
- Family: Gelechiidae
- Genus: Scrobipalpa
- Species: S. halonella

Binomial name
- Scrobipalpa halonella (Herrich-Schäffer, 1854)

Synonyms
- Gelechia halonella Herrich-Schäffer, 1854; Lita luridella Teich, 1886

Species of moth

Scrobipalpa halonella is a moth of the family Gelechiidae. It is only known from localities in Central Europe and Russia (the southern Ural).

The wingspan is about 16 mm (0.63 in).

The larvae feed on Centaurea scabiosa. They mine the leaves of their host plant.
