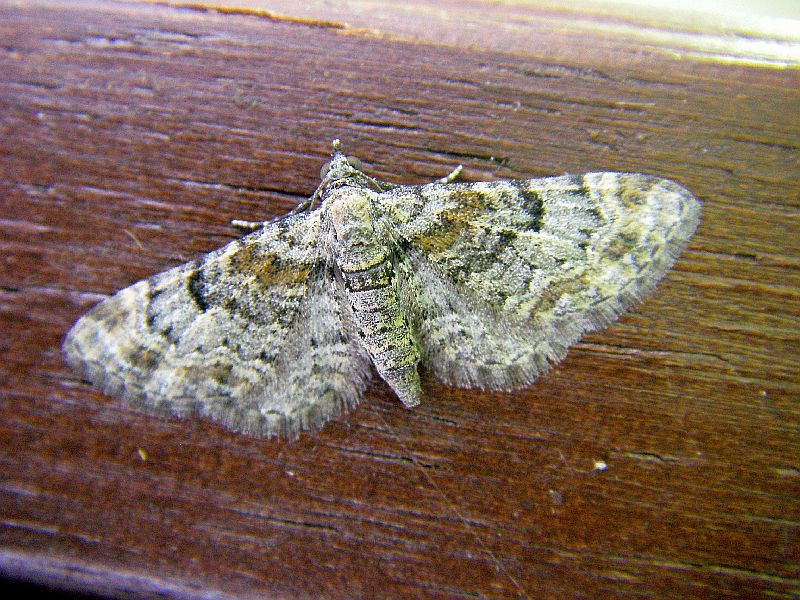

Scientific classification
- Domain: Eukaryota
- Kingdom: Animalia
- Phylum: Arthropoda
- Class: Insecta
- Order: Lepidoptera
- Family: Geometridae
- Genus: Eupithecia
- Species: E. laquaearia

Binomial name
- Eupithecia laquaearia Herrich-Schäffer, 1848

Synonyms
- Eupithecia merinata Guenee, 1858

= Eupithecia laquaearia =

Species of moth

Eupithecia laquaearia is a species of moth in the family Geometridae. It is found in central and southern Europe and Russia.

The length of the forewings is 12–15 mm. Adults are on wing from May to July in one generation per year.
