= Iwaruna robineaui =

Scientific classification
- Kingdom: Animalia
- Phylum: Arthropoda
- Class: Insecta
- Order: Lepidoptera
- Family: Gelechiidae
- Genus: Iwaruna
- Species: I. robineaui

Binomial name
- Iwaruna robineaui Nel, 2008

Species of moth

Iwaruna robineaui is a moth of the family Gelechiidae. It was described by Jacques Nel in 2008. It is found in France, where it has been recorded from the eastern Pyrenees.

The wingspan is 12 mm for males and 9.5 mm for females.
