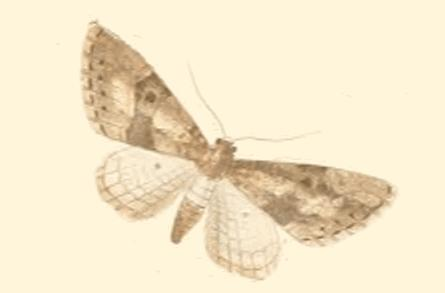

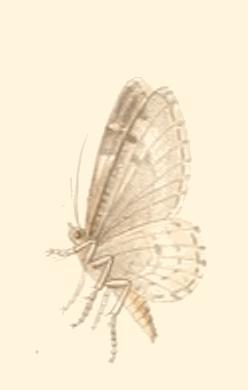

Scientific classification
- Domain: Eukaryota
- Kingdom: Animalia
- Phylum: Arthropoda
- Class: Insecta
- Order: Lepidoptera
- Family: Geometridae
- Genus: Eupithecia
- Species: E. gueneata

Binomial name
- Eupithecia gueneata Millière, 1862

Synonyms
- Eupithecia busambraria Ragusa, 1889

= Eupithecia gueneata =

Species of moth

Eupithecia gueneata is a moth in the family Geometridae. It is found in most of southern and eastern Europe, as well as the Near East and North Africa.

The wingspan is about 20 mm. Adults are on wing from the end of June to mid August.

The larvae feed on various Apiaceae species, including Peucedanum species (including Peucedanum oreoselinum) and Pimpinella saxifraga. Larvae can be found from July to October.

== Subspecies ==
- Eupithecia gueneata gueneata
- Eupithecia gueneata plantei Herbulot, 1981
