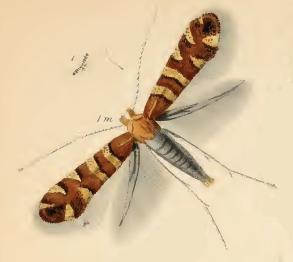

Scientific classification
- Domain: Eukaryota
- Kingdom: Animalia
- Phylum: Arthropoda
- Class: Insecta
- Order: Lepidoptera
- Family: Gracillariidae
- Genus: Phyllonorycter
- Species: P. stettinensis

Binomial name
- Phyllonorycter stettinensis (Nicelli, 1852)

Synonyms
- Lithocolletis stettinensis Nicelli, 1852

= Phyllonorycter stettinensis =

Species of moth

Phyllonorycter stettinensis is a moth of the family Gracillariidae. It is found from Scandinavia and Finland to the Pyrenees, Corsica, Italy and Bulgaria and from Great Britain to Russia.

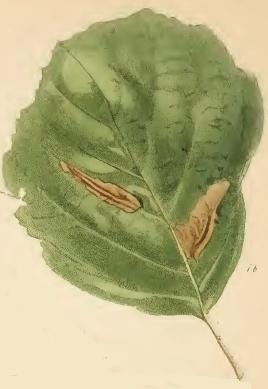
Alder leaf with two mines

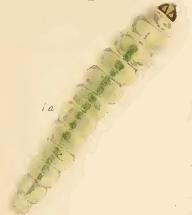
Larva

The wingspan is 6.5-7.5 mm. There are two generations per year with adults on wing in May and again in August.

The larvae feed on Alnus cordata, Alnus glutinosa and Alnus incana, mining the leaves of their host plant.
