= Caloptilia fribergensis =

Scientific classification
- Domain: Eukaryota
- Kingdom: Animalia
- Phylum: Arthropoda
- Class: Insecta
- Order: Lepidoptera
- Family: Gracillariidae
- Genus: Caloptilia
- Species: C. fribergensis

Binomial name
- Caloptilia fribergensis (Fritzsche, 1871)

Synonyms
- Gracilaria fribergensis Fritzsche, 1871; Gracillaria monspessulanella Klimesch, 1942

Species of moth

Caloptilia fribergensis is a moth of the family Gracillariidae. It is found from France, Germany, Poland and central Russia south to the Iberian Peninsula, Italy and North Macedonia.

The larvae feed on Acer monspessulanum and Acer pseudoplatanus. They mine the leaves of their host plant.
