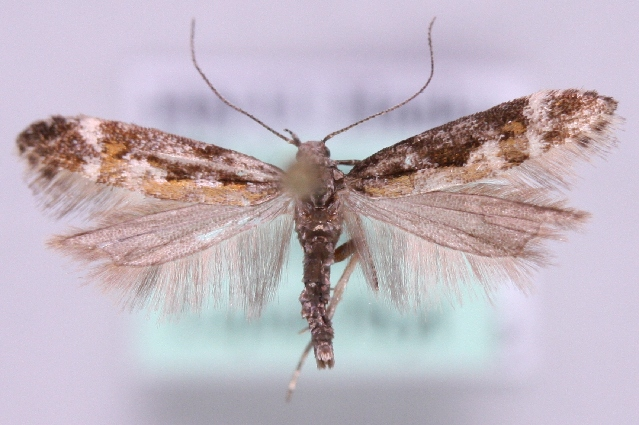

Scientific classification
- Kingdom: Animalia
- Phylum: Arthropoda
- Clade: Pancrustacea
- Class: Insecta
- Order: Lepidoptera
- Family: Gelechiidae
- Genus: Aristotelia
- Species: A. subdecurtella

Binomial name
- Aristotelia subdecurtella (Stainton, 1859)

Synonyms
- Gelechia subdecurtella Stainton, 1859

= Aristotelia subdecurtella =

Brown fen neb

Species of moth

Aristotelia subdecurtella, the brown fen neb, is a moth of the family Gelechiidae. It is found in most of Europe, except Norway, Belgium, Spain, Switzerland, the Czech Republic and most of the Balkan Peninsula. It is also found in the Russian Far East. The habitat consists of wetland areas.

The wingspan is 12–13 mm. Adults have been recorded on wing from late June to August.

The larvae feed on Lythrum salicaria and Stachys palustris. They live between shoots spun together with silk.
