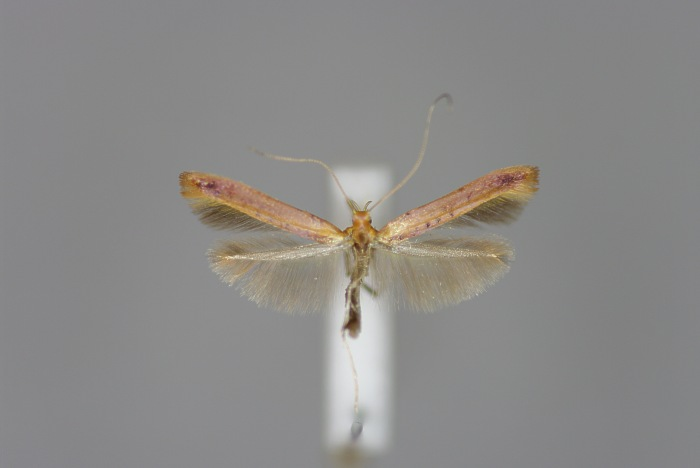

Scientific classification
- Domain: Eukaryota
- Kingdom: Animalia
- Phylum: Arthropoda
- Class: Insecta
- Order: Lepidoptera
- Family: Gracillariidae
- Genus: Caloptilia
- Species: C. rufipennella

Binomial name
- Caloptilia rufipennella Hübner, 1796

= Caloptilia rufipennella =

Small red slender

Species of moth

Caloptilia rufipennella (commonly known as small red slender) is a moth of the family Gracillariidae that is found throughout Europe.

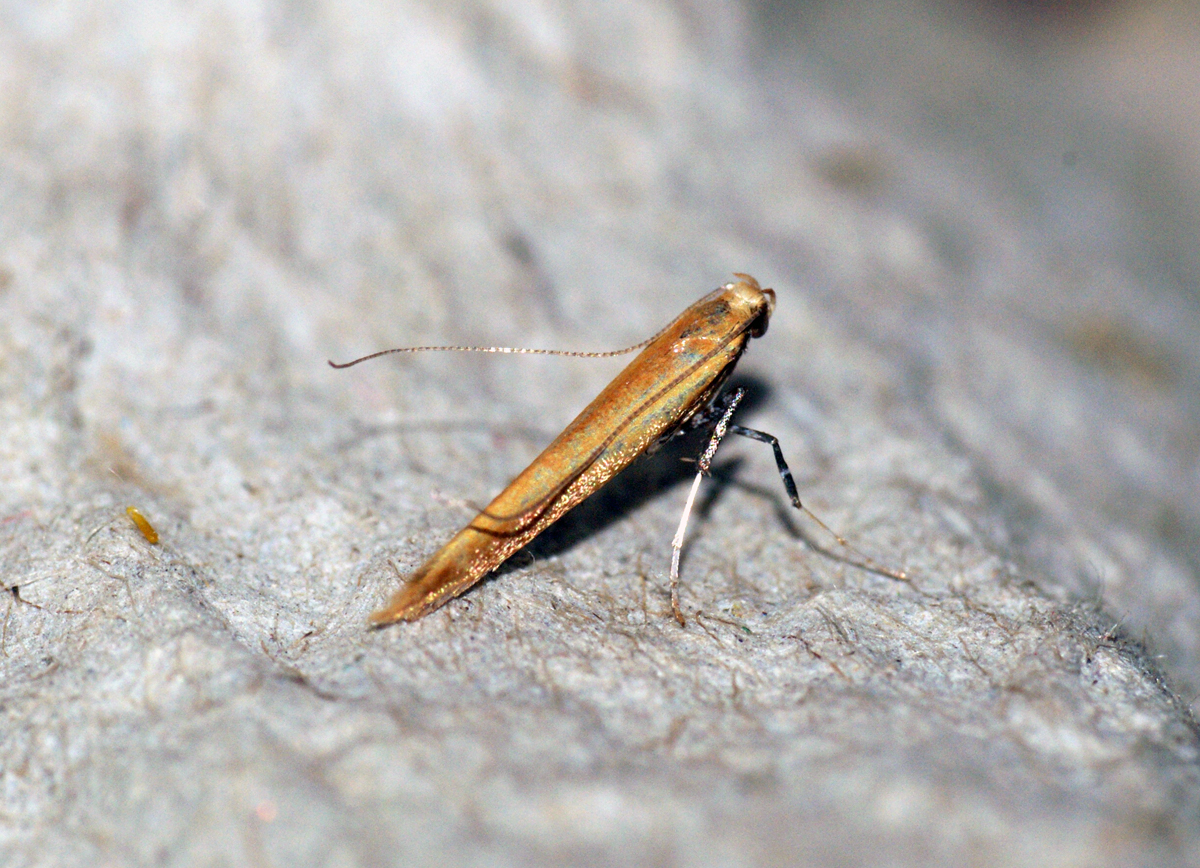

The wingspan is 11–12 millimetres (0.43–0.47 in). The forewings are chocolate brown to copper, usually cinnamon red with a white to yellow-greenish band along the wings. A few specimens are also yellow-red and have tiny black dots on their forewings. The legs are chocolate brown or black and have a striking pale band on the foretibia and a white admixture on the midfemur.The tarsi are white The larvae are greenish and have a light head. .

The moth flies from August to the next spring.

The larvae feed on Acer pseudoplatanus in a short brownish underside mine before down-rolling the leaf tips.
