= Scrobipalpa erichi =

Scientific classification
- Kingdom: Animalia
- Phylum: Arthropoda
- Clade: Pancrustacea
- Class: Insecta
- Order: Lepidoptera
- Family: Gelechiidae
- Genus: Scrobipalpa
- Species: S. erichi

Binomial name
- Scrobipalpa erichi Povolný, 1964

Species of moth

Scrobipalpa erichi is a moth in the family Gelechiidae. It was described by Povolný in 1964. It is found in Austria, Slovakia, the Czech Republic, Hungary, Romania, North Macedonia, Moldova, Ukraine, the Middle East, China (Inner Mongolia, Xinjiang), Iran, and Mongolia.

The wingspan is about 10 mm (0.39 in).

The larvae feed on Lycium barbarum, Nicotiana tabacum, and Solanum species.
