= Eupithecia graphata =

Scientific classification
- Domain: Eukaryota
- Kingdom: Animalia
- Phylum: Arthropoda
- Class: Insecta
- Order: Lepidoptera
- Family: Geometridae
- Genus: Eupithecia
- Species: E. graphata

Binomial name
- Eupithecia graphata (Treitschke, 1828)

Synonyms
- Cidaria graphata Treitschke, 1828; Acidalia corticulata Freyer, 1840; Eupithecia italicata Guenee, 1858; Eupithecia graeciata Schutze, 1958; Eupithecia mayeri Mann, 1853; Eupithecia mayerata Guenee, 1858

Species of moth

Eupithecia graphata is a moth in the family Geometridae. bIt was described by Treitschke in 1828. It is found in most of southern and eastern Europe, as well as the Near East.

The wingspan is 17–21 millimetres (0.67–0.83 in). Adults are on wing from April to May and again from July to August.

The larvae feed on Minuartia and Gypsophila species, as well as Jurinea mollis and Spergularia segetalis. Larvae can be found in July and August.

== Subspecies ==
- Eupithecia graphata graphata
- Eupithecia graphata albofasciata Staudinger, 1879
- Eupithecia graphata hesperia Wehrli, 1926
- Eupithecia graphata olympica Tuleschkov, 1951
- Eupithecia graphata setaceata Dietze, 1903
- Eupithecia graphata sproengertsi Dietze, 1910
