= Dichomeris barbella =

Scientific classification
- Kingdom: Animalia
- Phylum: Arthropoda
- Class: Insecta
- Order: Lepidoptera
- Family: Gelechiidae
- Genus: Dichomeris
- Species: D. barbella

Binomial name
- Dichomeris barbella (Denis & Schiffermüller, 1775)

Synonyms
- Tinea barbella Denis & Schiffermüller, 1775; Tinea barbella Hübner, [1805]

Species of moth

Dichomeris barbella is a moth of the family Gelechiidae. It is found in Germany, Austria, Slovakia, the Czech Republic, Italy, Hungary, Romania, North Macedonia and Ukraine.

The wingspan is 18–22 mm. Adults are on wing from May to July in one generation per year.

The larvae feed on Prunus species, including Prunus spinosa and Prunus domestica.
