= Phyllonorycter aemula =

Scientific classification
- Kingdom: Animalia
- Phylum: Arthropoda
- Clade: Pancrustacea
- Class: Insecta
- Order: Lepidoptera
- Family: Gracillariidae
- Genus: Phyllonorycter
- Species: P. aemula

Binomial name
- Phyllonorycter aemula Triberti, Deschka & Huemer, 1997

Species of moth

Phyllonorycter aemula is a moth of the family Gracillariidae. It is found in northern Italy and Austria.

Adults are on wing from April to early June and again from July to early August in two generations.

The larvae feed on Ostrya carpinifolia. They mine the leaves of their host plant.
