= Phyllonorycter alpina =

Scientific classification
- Kingdom: Animalia
- Phylum: Arthropoda
- Class: Insecta
- Order: Lepidoptera
- Family: Gracillariidae
- Genus: Phyllonorycter
- Species: P. alpina

Binomial name
- Phyllonorycter alpina (Frey, 1856)

Synonyms
- Lithocolletis alpina Frey, 1856; Lithocolletis hauderiella Rebel, 1913

Species of moth

Phyllonorycter alpina is a moth of the family Gracillariidae. It is found from Germany to Italy and from France to Ukraine.

The larvae feed on Alnus viridis. They mine the leaves of their host plant.
