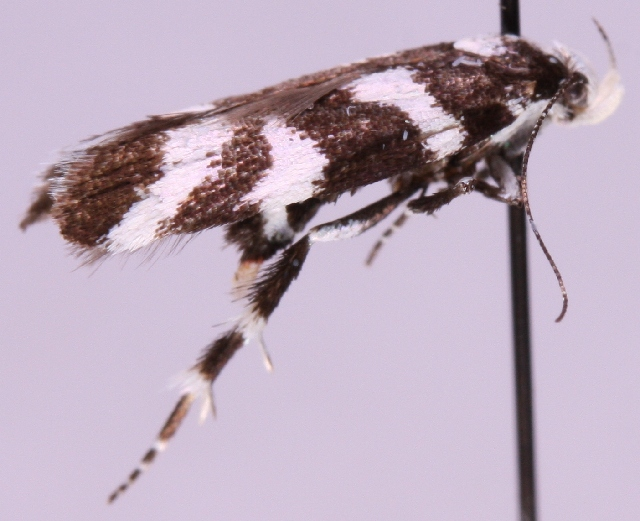

Scientific classification
- Kingdom: Animalia
- Phylum: Arthropoda
- Clade: Pancrustacea
- Class: Insecta
- Order: Lepidoptera
- Family: Gelechiidae
- Genus: Chionodes
- Species: C. viduella

Binomial name
- Chionodes viduella (Fabricius, 1794)

Synonyms
- Tinea viduella Fabricius, 1794; Tinea leucomella Quensel, 1802; Gelechia luctiferella Herrich-Schäffer, 1856; Gelechia labradoriella Clemens, 1863

= Chionodes viduella =

Species of moth

Chionodes viduella is a moth of the family Gelechiidae. It is found in France, Germany, Austria, Switzerland, Italy, the Czech Republic, Slovenia, Poland, Bulgaria, Norway, Sweden, Finland, the Baltic region and Russia. It is also found in northern North America, from Alaska to Maine.

The wingspan is 13–17 mm. Adults have been recorded on wing from May to August.

The larvae feed on Rubus chamaemorus, Vaccinium uliginosum, Betula and Juniperus species.
