= Phyllonorycter distentella =

Scientific classification
- Kingdom: Animalia
- Phylum: Arthropoda
- Clade: Pancrustacea
- Class: Insecta
- Order: Lepidoptera
- Family: Gracillariidae
- Genus: Phyllonorycter
- Species: P. distentella

Binomial name
- Phyllonorycter distentella (Zeller, 1846)

Synonyms
- Lithocolletis distentella Zeller, 1846

Species of moth

Phyllonorycter distentella is a moth of the family Gracillariidae. It is known from Germany to Portugal, Italy and Hungary and from Great Britain to southern Russia.

The wingspan is 8–9 mm. There are two generations per year with adults on wing in May and again in August.

The larvae feed on Quercus pubescens and Quercus robur. They mine the leaves of their host plant.
