= Caryocolum tischeriella =

Scientific classification
- Kingdom: Animalia
- Phylum: Arthropoda
- Clade: Pancrustacea
- Class: Insecta
- Order: Lepidoptera
- Family: Gelechiidae
- Genus: Caryocolum
- Species: C. tischeriella

Binomial name
- Caryocolum tischeriella (Zeller, 1839)

Synonyms
- Gelechia tischeriella Zeller, 1839; Lita tischeriella; Phthorimaea tischeriella; Gnorimoschema tischeriellum; Caryocolum tischeriellum

Species of moth

Caryocolum tischeriella (Zeller, 1839) is a moth of the family Gelechiidae. It is found in Portugal, Spain, France, Germany, Austria, Switzerland, Italy, the Czech Republic, Slovakia, Slovenia, Croatia, former Yugoslavia, Romania, Bulgaria, North Macedonia, Greece, Norway, Finland, the Baltic region and Russia, as well as on Crete and Sicily. Outside of Europe, it is found in southern Siberia, Central Asia and North Africa.

The length of the forewings is 5–6 mm.

== See also ==
- fischerella-group
  - Caryocolum fischerella (Treitschke, 1833)
- alsinella-group
  - Caryocolum albifaciella (Heinemann, 1870)
  - Caryocolum alsinella (Zeller, 1868)
  - Caryocolum viscariella (Stainton, 1855)
  - Caryocolum vicinella (Douglas, 1851)
  - Caryocolum bosalella (Rebel, 1936)
  - Caryocolum anatolicum Huemer, 1989
- sciurella-group
  - Caryocolum sciurella (Walsingham, 1908)
- nepalense-group
  - Caryocolum nepalense Povolny, 1968
  - Caryocolum longiusculum Huemer, 1988
  - Caryocolum vartianorum Huemer, 1988
- tetrameris-group
  - Caryocolum tetrameris (Meyrick, 1926)
  - Caryocolum paghmanum Huemer, 1988
- mongolense-group
  - Caryocolum mongolense Povolny, 1969
- amaurella-group
  - Caryocolum amaurella (Hering, 1924)
  - Caryocolum crypticum Huemer, Karsholt & Mutanen, 2014
  - Caryocolum iranicum Huemer, 1989
- oculatella-group
  - Caryocolum oculatella (Thomann, 1930)
- petryi-group
  - Caryocolum petryi (Hofmann, 1899)
  - Caryocolum afghanum Huemer, 1988
  - Caryocolum majus Huemer, 1988
  - Caryocolum splendens Povolny, 1977
  - Caryocolum dilatatum Huemer, 1989
  - Caryocolum spinosum Huemer, 1989
- saginella-group
  - Caryocolum inflativorella (Klimesch, 1938)
  - Caryocolum saginella (Zeller, 1868)
  - Caryocolum cauligenella (Schmid, 1863)
- trauniella-group
  - Caryocolum trauniella (Zeller, 1868)
  - Caryocolum peregrinella (Herrich-Schaffer, 1854)
  - Caryocolum delphinatella (Constant, 1890)
- provinciella-group
  - Caryocolum provinciella (Stainton, 1869)
- mucronatella-group
  - Caryocolum mucronatella (Chretien, 1900)
  - Caryocolum simulans Huemer, 1988
- leucomelanella-group
  - Caryocolum abhorrens Huemer, 1988
  - Caryocolum leucomelanella (Zeller, 1839)
  - Caryocolum immixtum Huemer, 1988
  - Caryocolum leucothoracellum (Klimesch, 1953)
  - Caryocolum schleichi (Christoph, 1872)
  - Caryocolum albithoracellum Huemer, 1989
  - Caryocolum similellum Huemer, 1989
- marmoreum-group
  - Caryocolum marmoreum (Haworth, 1828)
  - Caryocolum pullatella (Tengstrom, 1848)
  - Caryocolum protectum (Braun, 1965)
- stramentella-group
  - Caryocolum stramentella (Rebel, 1935)
- fraternella-group
  - Caryocolum hispanicum Huemer, 1988
  - Caryocolum confluens Huemer, 1988
  - Caryocolum fraternella (Douglas, 1851)
- interalbicella-group
  - Caryocolum klosi (Rebel, 1917)
  - Caryocolum interalbicella (Herrich-Schaffer, 1854)
  - Caryocolum laceratella (Zeller, 1868)
  - Caryocolum nearcticum Huemer, 1988
  - Caryocolum blandella (Douglas, 1852)
  - Caryocolum blandelloides Karsholt, 1981
  - Caryocolum horoscopa (Meyrick, 1926)
  - Caryocolum jaspidella (Chretien, 1908)
  - Caryocolum proximum (Haworth, 1828)
  - Caryocolum blandulella (Tutt, 1887)
  - Caryocolum tricolorella (Haworth, 1812)
  - Caryocolum fibigerium Huemer, 1988
  - Caryocolum junctella (Douglas, 1851)
  - Caryocolum kasyi Huemer, 1988
  - Caryocolum transiens Huemer, 1992
- extremum-group
  - Caryocolum extremum Huemer, 1988
- cassella-group
  - Caryocolum cassella (Walker, 1864)
- huebneri-group
  - Caryocolum moehringiae (Klimesch, 1954)
  - Caryocolum petrophilum (Preissecker, 1914)
  - Caryocolum huebneri (Haworth, 1828)
  - Caryocolum kroesmanniella (Herrich-Schaffer, 1854)
- unknown group
  - Caryocolum arenbergeri Huemer, 1989
  - Caryocolum baischi Huemer & Karsholt, 2010
  - Caryocolum dauphini Grange & Nel, 2012
  - Caryocolum divergens Huemer, 1989
  - Caryocolum gallagenellum Huemer, 1989
  - Caryocolum leucofasciatum Huemer, 1989
  - Caryocolum mazeli Huemer & Nel, 2005
  - Caryocolum repentis Huemer & Luquet, 1992
  - Caryocolum siculum Bella, 2008
  - Caryocolum srnkai Huemer & Karsholt, 201
