= Caryocolum spinosum =

Scientific classification
- Kingdom: Animalia
- Phylum: Arthropoda
- Clade: Pancrustacea
- Class: Insecta
- Order: Lepidoptera
- Family: Gelechiidae
- Genus: Caryocolum
- Species: C. spinosum

Binomial name
- Caryocolum spinosum Huemer, 1989

Species of moth

Caryocolum spinosum (Huemer, 1989) is a moth of the family Gelechiidae. It is found in northern Iran.

The length of the forewings is 5–6 mm. The ground colour of the forewings is medium brown and the hindwings are shining grey. Adults have been recorded on wing in mid-June.

== See also ==
- fischerella-group
  - Caryocolum fischerella (Treitschke, 1833)
- tischeriella-group
  - Caryocolum tischeriella (Zeller, 1839)
- alsinella-group
  - Caryocolum albifaciella (Heinemann, 1870)
  - Caryocolum alsinella (Zeller, 1868)
  - Caryocolum viscariella (Stainton, 1855)
  - Caryocolum vicinella (Douglas, 1851)
  - Caryocolum bosalella (Rebel, 1936)
  - Caryocolum anatolicum Huemer, 1989
- sciurella-group
  - Caryocolum sciurella (Walsingham, 1908)
- nepalense-group
  - Caryocolum nepalense Povolny, 1968
  - Caryocolum longiusculum Huemer, 1988
  - Caryocolum vartianorum Huemer, 1988
- tetrameris-group
  - Caryocolum tetrameris (Meyrick, 1926)
  - Caryocolum paghmanum Huemer, 1988
- mongolense-group
  - Caryocolum mongolense Povolny, 1969
- amaurella-group
  - Caryocolum amaurella (Hering, 1924)
  - Caryocolum crypticum Huemer, Karsholt & Mutanen, 2014
  - Caryocolum iranicum Huemer, 1989
- oculatella-group
  - Caryocolum oculatella (Thomann, 1930)
- petryi-group
  - Caryocolum petryi (Hofmann, 1899)
  - Caryocolum afghanum Huemer, 1988
  - Caryocolum majus Huemer, 1988
  - Caryocolum splendens Povolny, 1977
  - Caryocolum dilatatum Huemer, 1989
- saginella-group
  - Caryocolum inflativorella (Klimesch, 1938)
  - Caryocolum saginella (Zeller, 1868)
  - Caryocolum cauligenella (Schmid, 1863)
- trauniella-group
  - Caryocolum trauniella (Zeller, 1868)
  - Caryocolum peregrinella (Herrich-Schaffer, 1854)
  - Caryocolum delphinatella (Constant, 1890)
- provinciella-group
  - Caryocolum provinciella (Stainton, 1869)
- mucronatella-group
  - Caryocolum mucronatella (Chretien, 1900)
  - Caryocolum simulans Huemer, 1988
- leucomelanella-group
  - Caryocolum abhorrens Huemer, 1988
  - Caryocolum leucomelanella (Zeller, 1839)
  - Caryocolum immixtum Huemer, 1988
  - Caryocolum leucothoracellum (Klimesch, 1953)
  - Caryocolum schleichi (Christoph, 1872)
  - Caryocolum albithoracellum Huemer, 1989
  - Caryocolum similellum Huemer, 1989
- marmoreum-group
  - Caryocolum marmoreum (Haworth, 1828)
  - Caryocolum pullatella (Tengstrom, 1848)
  - Caryocolum protectum (Braun, 1965)
- stramentella-group
  - Caryocolum stramentella (Rebel, 1935)
- fraternella-group
  - Caryocolum hispanicum Huemer, 1988
  - Caryocolum confluens Huemer, 1988
  - Caryocolum fraternella (Douglas, 1851)
- interalbicella-group
  - Caryocolum klosi (Rebel, 1917)
  - Caryocolum interalbicella (Herrich-Schaffer, 1854)
  - Caryocolum laceratella (Zeller, 1868)
  - Caryocolum nearcticum Huemer, 1988
  - Caryocolum blandella (Douglas, 1852)
  - Caryocolum blandelloides Karsholt, 1981
  - Caryocolum horoscopa (Meyrick, 1926)
  - Caryocolum jaspidella (Chretien, 1908)
  - Caryocolum proximum (Haworth, 1828)
  - Caryocolum blandulella (Tutt, 1887)
  - Caryocolum tricolorella (Haworth, 1812)
  - Caryocolum fibigerium Huemer, 1988
  - Caryocolum junctella (Douglas, 1851)
  - Caryocolum kasyi Huemer, 1988
  - Caryocolum transiens Huemer, 1992
- extremum-group
  - Caryocolum extremum Huemer, 1988
- cassella-group
  - Caryocolum cassella (Walker, 1864)
- huebneri-group
  - Caryocolum moehringiae (Klimesch, 1954)
  - Caryocolum petrophilum (Preissecker, 1914)
  - Caryocolum huebneri (Haworth, 1828)
  - Caryocolum kroesmanniella (Herrich-Schaffer, 1854)
- unknown group
  - Caryocolum arenbergeri Huemer, 1989
  - Caryocolum baischi Huemer & Karsholt, 2010
  - Caryocolum dauphini Grange & Nel, 2012
  - Caryocolum divergens Huemer, 1989
  - Caryocolum gallagenellum Huemer, 1989
  - Caryocolum leucofasciatum Huemer, 1989
  - Caryocolum mazeli Huemer & Nel, 2005
  - Caryocolum repentis Huemer & Luquet, 1992
  - Caryocolum siculum Bella, 2008
  - Caryocolum srnkai Huemer & Karsholt, 201
