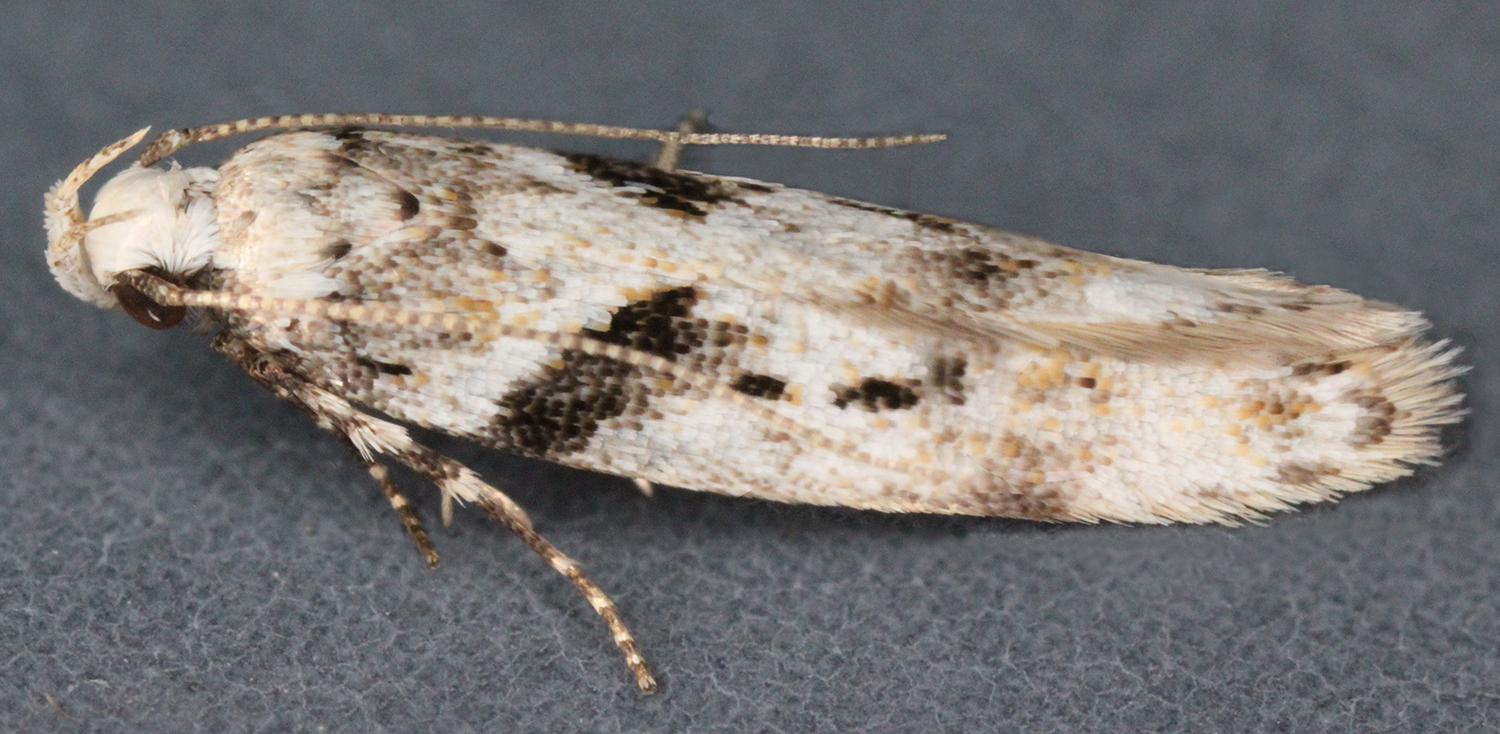
- Caryocolum blandella, Llanfyllin, North Wales

Scientific classification
- Domain: Eukaryota
- Kingdom: Animalia
- Phylum: Arthropoda
- Class: Insecta
- Order: Lepidoptera
- Family: Gelechiidae
- Genus: Caryocolum
- Species: C. blandella

Binomial name
- Caryocolum blandella (Douglas, 1852)

Synonyms
- Gelechia blandella Douglas, 1852; Gnorimoschema maculeum

= Caryocolum blandella =

Species of moth

Caryocolum blandella is a moth of the family Gelechiidae. It is found from central and northern Europe to the Ural Mountains and southern Siberia. Very similar to Caryocolum blandelloides, Caryocolum blandulella, Caryocolum huebneri and Caryocolum kroesmanniella Separated by genitalic examination.

The larvae feed on Stellaria holostea. Young larvae mine the leaves of their host plant. They can be found from April to June.
