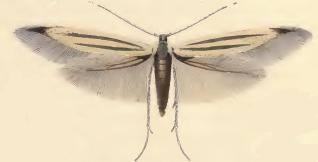

Scientific classification
- Kingdom: Animalia
- Phylum: Arthropoda
- Class: Insecta
- Order: Lepidoptera
- Family: Coleophoridae
- Genus: Coleophora
- Species: C. chalcogrammella

Binomial name
- Coleophora chalcogrammella Zeller, 1839

= Coleophora chalcogrammella =

Species of moth

Coleophora chalcogrammella is a moth of the family Coleophoridae. It was first described by Philipp Christoph Zeller in 1839 and is found in Europe.

== Description ==
The wingspan is 8–10 millimetres (0.31–0.39 in)

The larvae feed on thyme-leaf sandwort (Arenaria serpyllifolia), field mouse-ear, (Cerastium arvense), three-nerved sandwort (Moehringia trinervia), lesser stitchwort (Stellaria graminea) and greater stitchwort (Stellaria holostea). Full-grown cases can be found in May.

Pupa: The pupae of moths have visible head appendages, wings and legs which lie in sheaths.

== Distribution ==
It is found from Sweden and northern Russia to the Pyrenees and the Alps and from Great Britain to Romania.
