= Coleophora lithargyrinella =

Scientific classification
- Kingdom: Animalia
- Phylum: Arthropoda
- Class: Insecta
- Order: Lepidoptera
- Family: Coleophoridae
- Genus: Coleophora
- Species: C. lithargyrinella

Binomial name
- Coleophora lithargyrinella Zeller, 1849

Synonyms
- Coleophora fuscatella Toll, 1952; Coleophora olivacella Stainton, 1854

Species of moth

Coleophora lithargyrinella is a moth of the family Coleophoridae found in Europe.

== Description ==
The wingspan is 11–13.5 mm (0.43–0.53 in). The head is yellow-ochreous. Antennae white, ringed with dark fuscous, towards apex indistinctly, basal joint ochreous. Forewings fuscous-ochreous. Hindwings are dark grey. images

== Biology ==
Adults are on wing from June to July in one generation per year. The larvae feed on Arenaria serpyllifolia, Cerastium arvense, Cerastium glomeratum, Stellaria holostea and Stellaria media. Full-grown larvae can be found in May.

== Distribution ==
It is found from Fennoscandia to the Pyrenees and Italy, and from Ireland to the Baltic States and Romania.
