= Caryocolum trinella =

Scientific classification
- Domain: Eukaryota
- Kingdom: Animalia
- Phylum: Arthropoda
- Class: Insecta
- Order: Lepidoptera
- Family: Gelechiidae
- Genus: Caryocolum
- Species: C. trinella

Binomial name
- Caryocolum trinella (Fuchs, 1903)

Synonyms
- Lita trinella Fuchs, 1903; Scrobipalpa trinella

Species of moth

Caryocolum trinella is a moth of the family Gelechiidae. It was described from Armenia.

This species was stated to be closely related to Caryocolum petryi. The single type is lost, since the whereabouts of the Fuchs collection is unknown.
