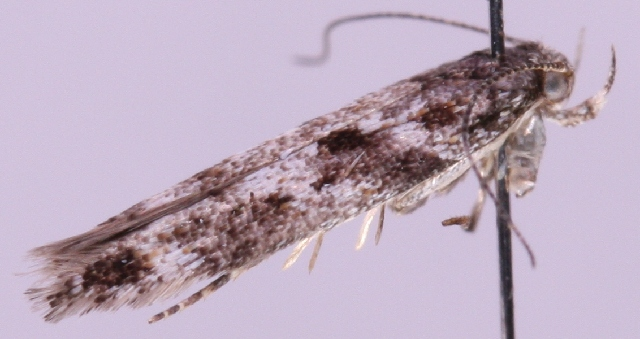

Scientific classification
- Domain: Eukaryota
- Kingdom: Animalia
- Phylum: Arthropoda
- Class: Insecta
- Order: Lepidoptera
- Family: Gelechiidae
- Genus: Caryocolum
- Species: C. petrophila

Binomial name
- Caryocolum petrophila (Preissecker, 1914)

Synonyms
- Gelechia (Lita) petrophila Preissecker, 1914; Phthorimaea petrophila; Lita petrophilia; Caryocolum petrophilon; Caryocolum petrophilum; Phthorimaea kemnerella Palm, 1947

= Caryocolum petrophila =

Species of moth

Caryocolum petrophila is a moth of the family Gelechiidae. It is found in France, Italy, Austria, Switzerland, Estonia, Scandinavia, North Macedonia and Russia. It is also found in Turkey.

The length of the forewings is 5–6 mm for males and about 5 mm for females. Adults have been recorded on wing from June to mid-September.

The larvae feed on Cerastium arvense and Stellaria graminea. Young larvae mine the leaves of their host plant. Larvae can be found from May to June.
