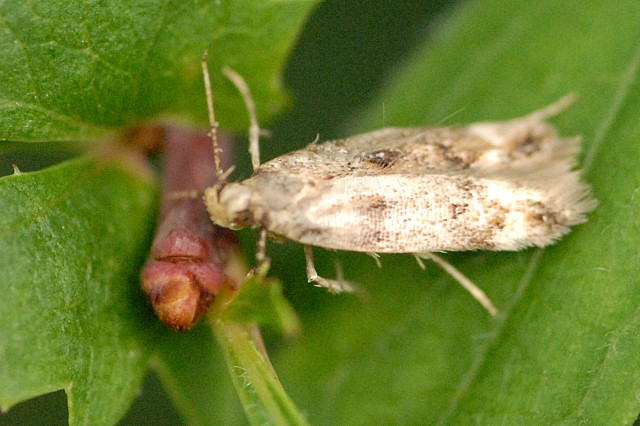
- Caryocolum blandella

Scientific classification
- Kingdom: Animalia
- Phylum: Arthropoda
- Clade: Pancrustacea
- Class: Insecta
- Order: Lepidoptera
- Family: Gelechiidae
- Tribe: Gnorimoschemini
- Genus: Caryocolum; Gregor & Povolný, 1954

= Caryocolum =

Genus of moths

Caryocolum is a genus of moths in the family Gelechiidae.

== Distribution ==
The genus is distributed between 28° N and 68° N throughout the Palearctic realm and is also represented by a small number of species in the Nearctic realm. Most of the species occur in mountainous areas.

== Selected species ==
The genus consists of the following species:

- fischerella-group
  - Caryocolum fischerella (Treitschke, 1833)
- tischeriella-group
  - Caryocolum tischeriella (Zeller, 1839)
- alsinella-group
  - Caryocolum albifaciella (Heinemann, 1870)
  - Caryocolum alsinella (Zeller, 1868)
  - Caryocolum viscariella (Stainton, 1855)
  - Caryocolum vicinella (Douglas, 1851)
  - Caryocolum bosalella (Rebel, 1936)
  - Caryocolum anatolicum Huemer, 1989
- sciurella-group
  - Caryocolum sciurella (Walsingham, 1908)
- nepalense-group
  - Caryocolum nepalense Povolny, 1968
  - Caryocolum longiusculum Huemer, 1988
  - Caryocolum vartianorum Huemer, 1988
- tetrameris-group
  - Caryocolum tetrameris (Meyrick, 1926)
  - Caryocolum paghmanum Huemer, 1988
- mongolense-group
  - Caryocolum mongolense Povolny, 1969
- amaurella-group
  - Caryocolum amaurella (Hering, 1924)
  - Caryocolum crypticum Huemer, Karsholt & Mutanen, 2014
  - Caryocolum iranicum Huemer, 1989
- oculatella-group
  - Caryocolum oculatella (Thomann, 1930)
- petryi-group
  - Caryocolum petryi (Hofmann, 1899)
  - Caryocolum afghanum Huemer, 1988
  - Caryocolum majus Huemer, 1988
  - Caryocolum splendens Povolny, 1977
  - Caryocolum dilatatum Huemer, 1989
  - Caryocolum spinosum Huemer, 1989
- saginella-group
  - Caryocolum inflativorella (Klimesch, 1938)
  - Caryocolum saginella (Zeller, 1868)
  - Caryocolum cauligenella (Schmid, 1863)
- trauniella-group
  - Caryocolum trauniella (Zeller, 1868)
  - Caryocolum peregrinella (Herrich-Schaffer, 1854)
  - Caryocolum delphinatella (Constant, 1890)
- provinciella-group
  - Caryocolum provinciella (Stainton, 1869)
- mucronatella-group
  - Caryocolum mucronatella (Chretien, 1900)
  - Caryocolum simulans Huemer, 1988
- leucomelanella-group
  - Caryocolum abhorrens Huemer, 1988
  - Caryocolum leucomelanella (Zeller, 1839)
  - Caryocolum immixtum Huemer, 1988
  - Caryocolum leucothoracellum (Klimesch, 1953)
  - Caryocolum schleichi (Christoph, 1872)
  - Caryocolum albithoracellum Huemer, 1989
  - Caryocolum similellum Huemer, 1989
- marmoreum-group
  - Caryocolum marmoreum (Haworth, 1828)
  - Caryocolum pullatella (Tengstrom, 1848)
  - Caryocolum protectum (Braun, 1965)
- stramentella-group
  - Caryocolum stramentella (Rebel, 1935)
- fraternella-group
  - Caryocolum hispanicum Huemer, 1988
  - Caryocolum confluens Huemer, 1988
  - Caryocolum fraternella (Douglas, 1851)
- interalbicella-group
  - Caryocolum klosi (Rebel, 1917)
  - Caryocolum interalbicella (Herrich-Schaffer, 1854)
  - Caryocolum laceratella (Zeller, 1868)
  - Caryocolum nearcticum Huemer, 1988
  - Caryocolum blandella (Douglas, 1852)
  - Caryocolum blandelloides Karsholt, 1981
  - Caryocolum horoscopa (Meyrick, 1926)
  - Caryocolum jaspidella (Chretien, 1908)
  - Caryocolum proximum (Haworth, 1828)
  - Caryocolum blandulella (Tutt, 1887)
  - Caryocolum tricolorella (Haworth, 1812)
  - Caryocolum fibigerium Huemer, 1988
  - Caryocolum junctella (Douglas, 1851)
  - Caryocolum kasyi Huemer, 1988
  - Caryocolum transiens Huemer, 1992
- extremum-group
  - Caryocolum extremum Huemer, 1988
- cassella-group
  - Caryocolum cassella (Walker, 1864)
- huebneri-group
  - Caryocolum moehringiae (Klimesch, 1954)
  - Caryocolum petrophilum (Preissecker, 1914)
  - Caryocolum huebneri (Haworth, 1828)
  - Caryocolum kroesmanniella (Herrich-Schaffer, 1854)
- unknown group
  - Caryocolum arenbergeri Huemer, 1989
  - Caryocolum baischi Huemer & Karsholt, 2010
  - Caryocolum dauphini Grange & Nel, 2012
  - Caryocolum divergens Huemer, 1989
  - Caryocolum gallagenellum Huemer, 1989
  - Caryocolum leucofasciatum Huemer, 1989
  - Caryocolum mazeli Huemer & Nel, 2005
  - Caryocolum repentis Huemer & Luquet, 1992
  - Caryocolum siculum Bella, 2008
  - Caryocolum srnkai Huemer & Karsholt, 2011

== Possible species ==
- Caryocolum crepusculella (Teich, 1889)
- Caryocolum trinella (Fuchs, 1903)
