= Caryocolum srnkai =

Scientific classification
- Kingdom: Animalia
- Phylum: Arthropoda
- Clade: Pancrustacea
- Class: Insecta
- Order: Lepidoptera
- Family: Gelechiidae
- Genus: Caryocolum
- Species: C. srnkai

Binomial name
- Caryocolum srnkai Huemer & Karsholt, 2011

Species of moth

Caryocolum srnkai is a moth of the family Gelechiidae. It is found in Montenegro.

== Appearance ==
Caryocolum srnkai is a small moth (with the wingspan of 11-14 mm) with black forewings mottled with white, featuring prominent white costal and tornal spots. The labial palps are blackish brown mottled with cream-white. It is very similar to C. amaurella and some C. petryi, but can be distinguished by its male genitalia, which have a valva with a distinctly larger dorsal hump than ventral hump, a small sacculus, and a slender phallus.

== Distribution ==
Endemic to Montenegro, this species is known from only three individuals collected in Durmitor National Park.

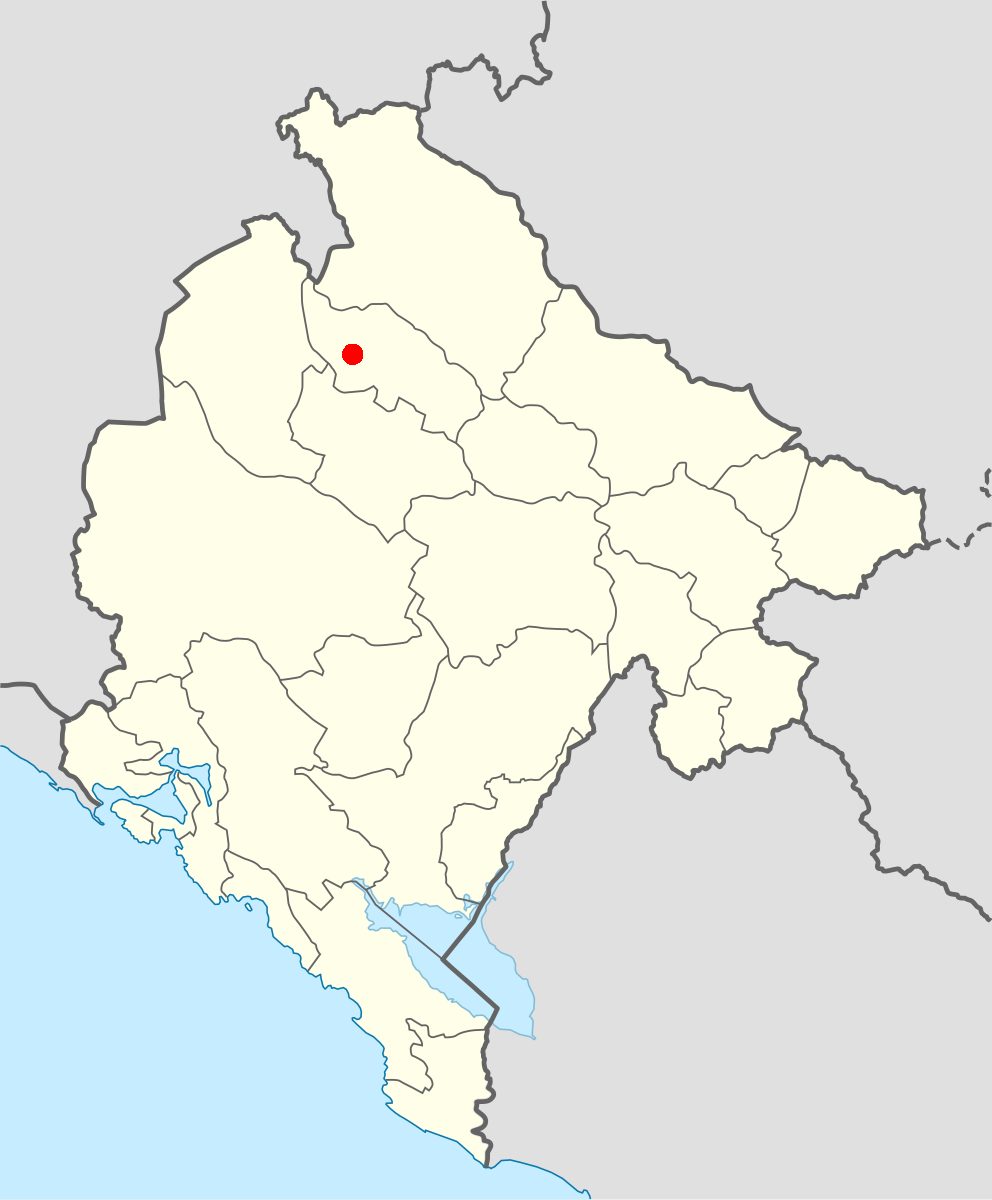
Caryocolum srnkai records map, in Montenegro
