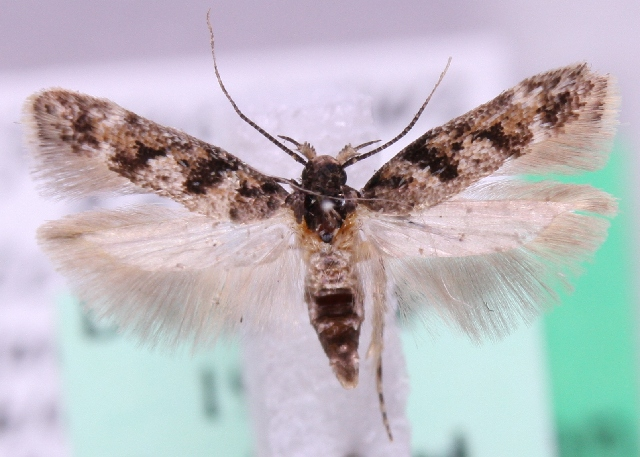

Scientific classification
- Kingdom: Animalia
- Phylum: Arthropoda
- Clade: Pancrustacea
- Class: Insecta
- Order: Lepidoptera
- Family: Gelechiidae
- Genus: Caryocolum
- Species: C. alsinella

Binomial name
- Caryocolum alsinella (Zeller, 1868)

Synonyms
- Gelechia alsinella Zeller, 1868; Lita alsinella; Phthorimaea alsinella; Lita albifrontella Heinemann, 1870; Lita tristella Heinemann, 1870; Lita semidecandriella Tutt, 1887; Gelechia semidecandrella; Phthorimaea semidecandrella

= Caryocolum alsinella =

Species of moth

Caryocolum alsinella is a moth of the family Gelechiidae. It is found throughout Europe It is also present in North Africa (including Morocco).

The length of the forewings is 4–5 mm.Differs from Caryocolum proxima as follows: forewings somewhat narrower, a distinctly marked black dot in disc before costal bar, posterior fascia not angulated, forming two direct opposite spots. Larva pale yellowish; head black; 2 red-brown, plate black.

Adults have been recorded on wing from late June to late September.

The larvae feed on Arenaria montana, Cerastium arvense, Cerastium diffusum, Cerastium fontanum, Cerastium semidecandrum, Minuartia verna, Moehringia and Stellaria species. Young larvae mine the leaves of their host plant.
