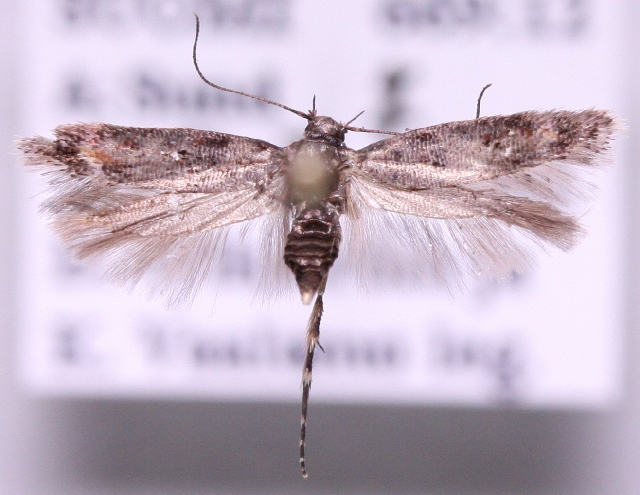

Scientific classification
- Domain: Eukaryota
- Kingdom: Animalia
- Phylum: Arthropoda
- Class: Insecta
- Order: Lepidoptera
- Family: Gelechiidae
- Genus: Caryocolum
- Species: C. junctella

Binomial name
- Caryocolum junctella (Douglas, 1851)

Synonyms
- Gelechia junctella Douglas, 1851; Caryocolum junctellum; Lita junctella; Phthorimaea junctella; Gnorimoschema junctellum; Phthorimaea aganocarpa Meyrick, 1935; Gnorimoschema aganocarpa

= Caryocolum junctella =

Species of moth

Caryocolum junctella is a moth of the family Gelechiidae. It is found from most of Europe (except Ireland, the Netherlands, Croatia, Portugal and possibly Spain and parts of the Balkan Peninsula) east to China and Japan.

The length of the forewings is 4.5–5 mm. Adults have been recorded on wing from April to August. They overwinter.

The larvae feed on Cerastium arvense, Cerastium glomeratum, Stellaria graminea and Stellaria media. Young larvae mine the leaves of their host plant.
