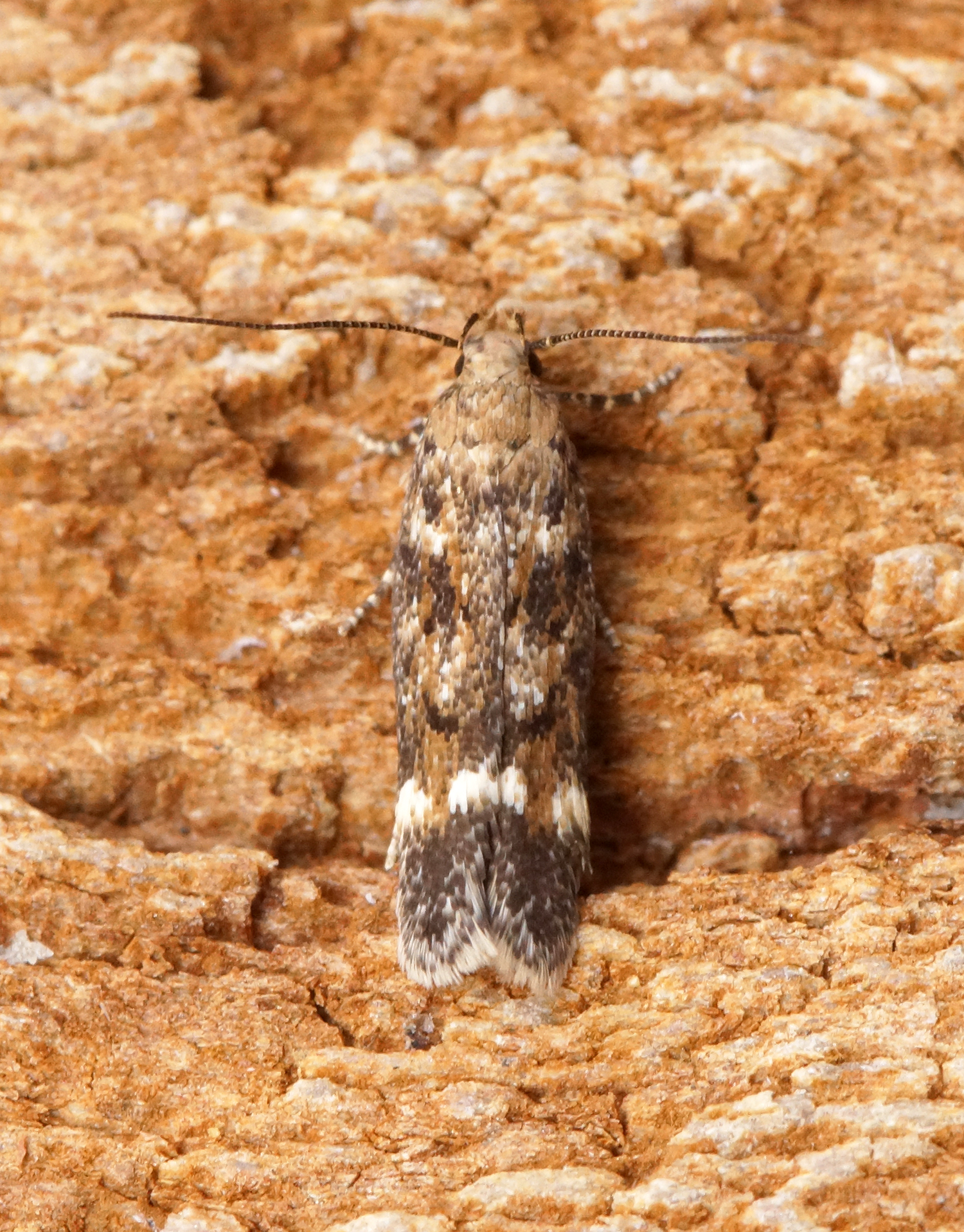

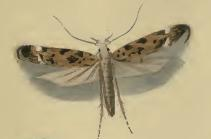

Scientific classification
- Domain: Eukaryota
- Kingdom: Animalia
- Phylum: Arthropoda
- Class: Insecta
- Order: Lepidoptera
- Family: Gelechiidae
- Genus: Caryocolum
- Species: C. fraternella

Binomial name
- Caryocolum fraternella (Douglas, 1851)

Synonyms
- Gelechia fraternella Douglas, 1851; Lita intermediella Hodgkinson, 1897; Lita fraternella; Phthorimaea fraternella; Gnorimoschema fraternellum

= Caryocolum fraternella =

Species of moth

Caryocolum fraternella is a moth of the family Gelechiidae. It is found in Ireland, Great Britain, Fennoscandia, Denmark, Germany, the Netherlands, France, Switzerland, Spain, Latvia, Estonia and Ukraine.

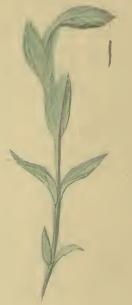
A sprig of Stellaria uliginosa with the terminal shoot spun together

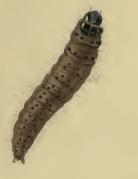
Larva

The wingspan is 10–13 mm. The head is reddish-fuscous, whitish-mixed. Terminal joint of palpi as long as second. Forewings are reddish-brown, somewhat whitish-sprinkled, edges blackish -mixed; black basal and subbasal spots in middle stigmata black, two anterior confluent with a dark black-mixed oblique bar from costa, second discal connected with a blackish tornal spot; a white tornal spot following this, and another on costa slightly beyond it. Hindwings 1, grey. The larva dull greenish-brown, segmental incisions paler; dots black; head and plate of 2 black.

Adults are on wing from July to August.

The larvae feed on Stellaria species (including Stellaria uliginosa and Stellaria graminea) and Cerastium fontanum. They feed in the terminal shoots of their host plant.
