= Caryocolum interalbicella =

Scientific classification
- Kingdom: Animalia
- Phylum: Arthropoda
- Clade: Pancrustacea
- Class: Insecta
- Order: Lepidoptera
- Family: Gelechiidae
- Genus: Caryocolum
- Species: C. interalbicella

Binomial name
- Caryocolum interalbicella (Herrich-Schaffer, 1854)

Synonyms
- Gelechia interalbicella Herrich-Schaffer, 1854; Gnorimoschema interalbicellum; Tinea quadrella Fabricius, 1794 (Junior primary homonym of Tinea quadrella [Denis & Schiffermuller], 1775)

Species of moth

Caryocolum interalbicella is a moth of the family Gelechiidae. It is found in France, Germany, Austria, Switzerland and Italy.

The length of the forewings is 7–8 mm for males and 6-7.5 mm for females. Adults have been recorded on wing from late June to late August.

The larvae feed on Cerastium arvense. Larvae can be found in mid-April.
