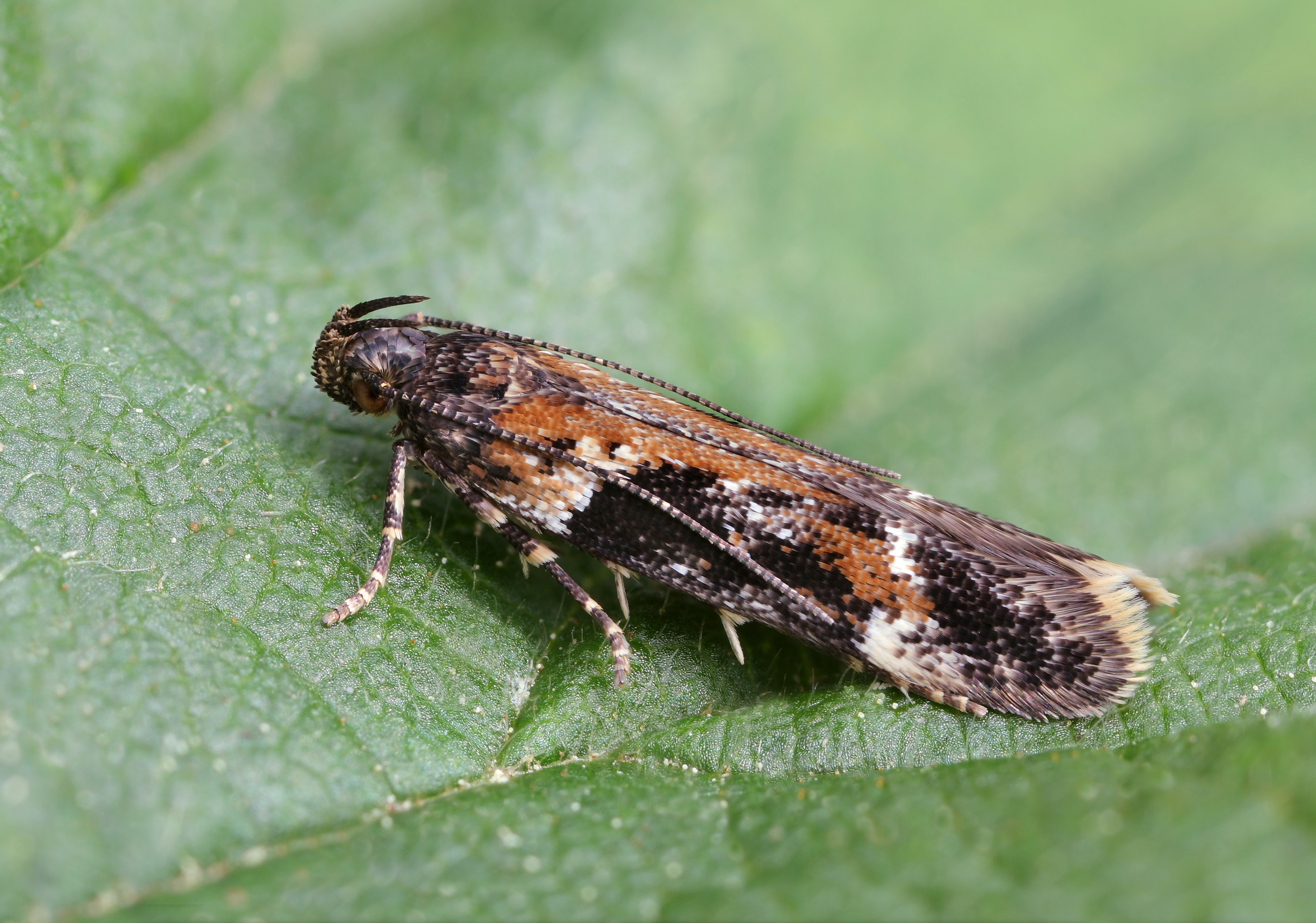

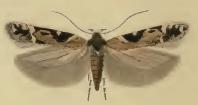

Scientific classification
- Kingdom: Animalia
- Phylum: Arthropoda
- Clade: Pancrustacea
- Class: Insecta
- Order: Lepidoptera
- Family: Gelechiidae
- Genus: Caryocolum
- Species: C. tricolorella

Binomial name
- Caryocolum tricolorella (Haworth, 1812)

Synonyms
- Tinea tricolorella Haworth, 1812; Caryocolum tricolorellum; Recurvaria contigua Haworth, 1828; Anacampsis contigua; Gelechia contigua; Anacampsis tricolorella; Gelechia acernella Herrich-Schaffer, 1854

= Caryocolum tricolorella =

Species of moth

Caryocolum tricolorella is a moth of the family Gelechiidae. It is found from Fennoscandia to the Pyrenees, Alps and Romania and from Ireland to Russia and Ukraine.

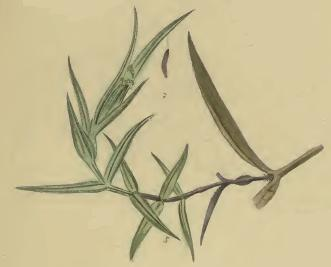
A sprig of Stellaria holostea with a young shoot attacked by larva

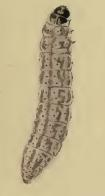
Larva

The wingspan is about 12 mm. The head is dark fuscous, face whitish-suffused. Terminal joint of palpi almost as long as second. Forewings are ferruginous-brown, costa and termen suffused with blackish; a white rather oblique fascia at 1/4, followed by a triangular black costal blotch; a white irroration in middle of disc; second discal stigma black; an angulated white fascia at 3/4 sometimes interrupted to form two spots, costal larger and rather posterior. Hindwings 1, light grey.

Adults are on wing from June to August.
