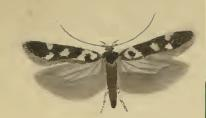

Scientific classification
- Domain: Eukaryota
- Kingdom: Animalia
- Phylum: Arthropoda
- Class: Insecta
- Order: Lepidoptera
- Family: Gelechiidae
- Genus: Caryocolum
- Species: C. vicinella

Binomial name
- Caryocolum vicinella (Douglas, 1851)

Synonyms
- Gelechia vicinella Douglas, 1851; Lita inflatella Chretien, 1901; Gnorimoschema inflatella; Phtorimaea inflatella

= Caryocolum vicinella =

Species of moth

Caryocolum vicinella is a moth of the family Gelechiidae. It is found in most of Europe, eastwards to the southern Ural.

== Taxonomy ==
The wingspan is about 12 mm. The head is grey, face whitish. Terminal joint of palpi shorter than second. Forewings fuscous, darker-sprinkled; a whitish suffusion along dorsum, near base extending indistinctly to costa, and prominent upwards in middle of disc, where it is also sometimes connected with costa; stigmata black, second discal often large; a nearly straight rather broad white interrupted fascia at 3/4. Hindwings grey.

Adults are on wing from July to September.

The larvae feed on Cerastium arvense, Dianthus, Lychnis alpina, Lychnis viscaria, Minuartia, Petrorhagia prolifera, Petrorhagia saxifraga, Silene inflata, Silene nutans, Silene vulgaris maritima, Spergularia rubra, Stellaria media, Stellaria nemorum and Stellaria uliginosum. They may mine the leaves of their host plant when young, but this is unconfirmed. Older larvae mine the stem of their host plant, although other sources state they live among spun shoots. Larvae can be found from mid April to the beginning of June.

== Gallery ==
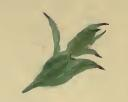
A sprig of Silene uniflora eaten by larva.

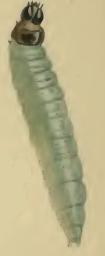
A larva of Caryocolum vicinella.
