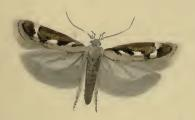

Scientific classification
- Kingdom: Animalia
- Phylum: Arthropoda
- Clade: Pancrustacea
- Class: Insecta
- Order: Lepidoptera
- Family: Gelechiidae
- Genus: Caryocolum
- Species: C. marmorea

Binomial name
- Caryocolum marmorea (Haworth, 1828)

Synonyms
- Recurvaria marmorea Haworth, 1828; Caryocolum marmoreum; Gelechia manniella Zeller, 1839; Gelechia pulchra Wollaston, 1858

= Caryocolum marmorea =

Species of moth

Caryocolum marmorea is a moth of the family Gelechiidae. It is found from Scandinavia to the Mediterranean islands, and from Ireland to Poland, Hungary and Greece. It is also found on the Canary Islands and Madeira. It is also found in North America.

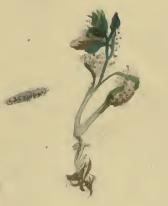
A sprig of Cerastium vulgatum with sand-tubes formed by larva

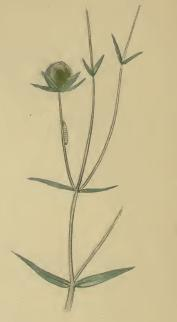
A sprig of Stellaria holostea exhibiting a capsule attacked by larva

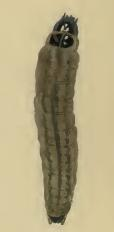
Larva

The wingspan is about 11 mm. The head is light grey, face whitish. Terminal joint of palpi shorter than second. Forewings are ochreous- brown, costa mixed with dark fuscous and sometimes whitish, dorsum broadly paler and sometimes whitish mixed, connected with two pale or sometimes whitish spots before and beyond anterior stigmata, tornus and termen blackish-mixed; a blackish discal spot towards base; stigmata blackish, usually suffused and indistinct; a straight whitish interrupted fascia at 4/5. Hindwings 1, pale grey, darker terminally. The larva is yellowish-grey - green; dorsal and subdorsal lines dull reddish; head and plate of 2 black

Adults are on wing from May to August.

The larvae feed on Cerastium fontanum, Cerastium semidecandrum, Silene nocteolens and Silene otites. They mine the leaves of their host plant. Larvae can be found from January to February. They are greenish yellow with three dirty green dorsal length lines and a black head.

== Subspecies ==
- Caryocolum marmorea marmorea
- Caryocolum marmorea pulchra (Wollaston, 1858)
