= Caryocolum extremum =

Scientific classification
- Kingdom: Animalia
- Phylum: Arthropoda
- Clade: Pancrustacea
- Class: Insecta
- Order: Lepidoptera
- Family: Gelechiidae
- Genus: Caryocolum
- Species: C. extremum

Binomial name
- Caryocolum extremum Huemer, 1988

Species of moth

Caryocolum extremum is a moth of the family Gelechiidae. It is found in Nepal. The habitat consists of primary montane oak forests.

The length of the forewings is about 5.5 mm. Adults have been recorded on wing from late May to mid-July.
