= Caryocolum mongolense =

Scientific classification
- Domain: Eukaryota
- Kingdom: Animalia
- Phylum: Arthropoda
- Class: Insecta
- Order: Lepidoptera
- Family: Gelechiidae
- Genus: Caryocolum
- Species: C. mongolense

Binomial name
- Caryocolum mongolense Povolny, 1969

Species of moth

Caryocolum mongolense is a moth of the family Gelechiidae. It is found in Mongolia.

The length of the forewings is 7.5–8 mm. Adults have been recorded on wing in late August.
