= Caryocolum siculum =

Scientific classification
- Domain: Eukaryota
- Kingdom: Animalia
- Phylum: Arthropoda
- Class: Insecta
- Order: Lepidoptera
- Family: Gelechiidae
- Genus: Caryocolum
- Species: C. siculum

Binomial name
- Caryocolum siculum Bella, 2008

Species of moth

Caryocolum siculum is a moth of the family Gelechiidae. It is found on central and south-eastern Sicily.

The wingspan is 12 mm.
