= Caryocolum trauniella =

Scientific classification
- Kingdom: Animalia
- Phylum: Arthropoda
- Clade: Pancrustacea
- Class: Insecta
- Order: Lepidoptera
- Family: Gelechiidae
- Genus: Caryocolum
- Species: C. trauniella

Binomial name
- Caryocolum trauniella (Zeller, 1868)

Synonyms
- Gelechia trauniella Zeller, 1868; Caryocolum trauniellum

Species of moth

Caryocolum trauniella is a moth of the family Gelechiidae. It is found in Austria, Italy and Slovenia.

The length of the forewings is about 6 mm for males and 6–7 mm for females. Adults have been recorded on wing from late June to mid-July.
