= Caryocolum paghmanum =

Scientific classification
- Kingdom: Animalia
- Phylum: Arthropoda
- Clade: Pancrustacea
- Class: Insecta
- Order: Lepidoptera
- Family: Gelechiidae
- Genus: Caryocolum
- Species: C. paghmanum

Binomial name
- Caryocolum paghmanum Huemer, 1988

Species of moth

Caryocolum paghmanum is a moth of the family Gelechiidae. It is found in Afghanistan.

The length of the forewings is 5.5–6 mm for males and 6 mm for females. Adults have been recorded on wing from the end of July to early August.
