= Caryocolum arenbergeri =

Scientific classification
- Kingdom: Animalia
- Phylum: Arthropoda
- Clade: Pancrustacea
- Class: Insecta
- Order: Lepidoptera
- Family: Gelechiidae
- Genus: Caryocolum
- Species: C. arenbergeri

Binomial name
- Caryocolum arenbergeri Huemer, 1989

Species of moth

Caryocolum arenbergeri is a moth of the family Gelechiidae. It is found in Portugal and Spain.
