= Caryocolum abhorrens =

Scientific classification
- Kingdom: Animalia
- Phylum: Arthropoda
- Clade: Pancrustacea
- Class: Insecta
- Order: Lepidoptera
- Family: Gelechiidae
- Genus: Caryocolum
- Species: C. abhorrens

Binomial name
- Caryocolum abhorrens Huemer, 1988

Species of moth

Caryocolum abhorrens is a moth of the family Gelechiidae. It is found in Afghanistan.

The length of the forewings is about 5 mm. Adults have been recorded on wing at the end of June.
