= Caryocolum mucronatella =

Scientific classification
- Kingdom: Animalia
- Phylum: Arthropoda
- Class: Insecta
- Order: Lepidoptera
- Family: Gelechiidae
- Genus: Caryocolum
- Species: C. mucronatella

Binomial name
- Caryocolum mucronatella (Chretien, 1900)

Synonyms
- Lita mucronatella Chretien, 1900; Phthorimaea mucronatella; Lita poschiavensis Rebel, 1936; Lita boschiavensis Rebel, 1936; Gnorimoschema poschiavense (Rebel) Klimesch, 1953; Caryocolum poschiavense

Species of moth

Caryocolum mucronatella is a moth of the family Gelechiidae. It is found in Portugal, Spain, France, Germany, Austria, Switzerland, Italy, Slovenia, North Macedonia, Greece and Turkey.

The length of the forewings is 4.5-5.5 mm for males and 4–5.5 mm for females. Adults have been recorded on wing from the end of June to late August.

The larvae feed on the leaves of Minuartia mutabilis, Minuartia setacea, Minuartia verna attica and Minuartia laricifolia. Larvae can be found from late May to mid-July.
