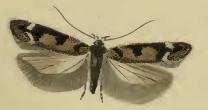

Scientific classification
- Kingdom: Animalia
- Phylum: Arthropoda
- Clade: Pancrustacea
- Class: Insecta
- Order: Lepidoptera
- Family: Gelechiidae
- Genus: Caryocolum
- Species: C. viscariella

Binomial name
- Caryocolum viscariella (Stainton, 1855)

Synonyms
- Gelechia viscariella Stainton, 1855; Lita viscariella; Phthorimaea viscariella

= Caryocolum viscariella =

Species of moth

Caryocolum viscariella is a moth of the family Gelechiidae. It is found in Ireland, Great Britain, Fennoscandia, Denmark, Germany, France, Switzerland, Austria, Hungary, Italy, Estonia and Russia.

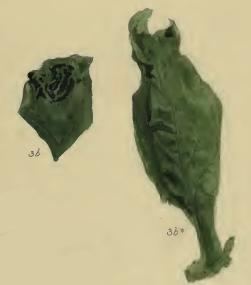
A shoot of Silene dioica attacked by larva (3b*), and a section of the shoot (3b)

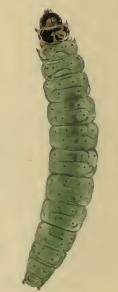
Larva

The wingspan is about 12 mm. The head is dark fuscous, mixed with whitish-fuscous. Terminal joint of palpi shorter than second. Forewings deep ochreous-brown, much mixed with dark fuscous; a dark spot on fold near base; stigmata black, indistinct, plical separating two obscure paler triangular dorsal blotches; a slightly angulated sometimes interrupted whitish-ochreous fascia at 3,4. Hindwings grey. Larva dull green; dorsal line darker; head black; 2 reddish=grey, plate black, bisected: in spun shoots.

Adults are on wing from June to July in one generation per year.

The larvae feed on Silene dioica, Silene alba and Lychnis viscaria. The larvae can be found from April to June.
