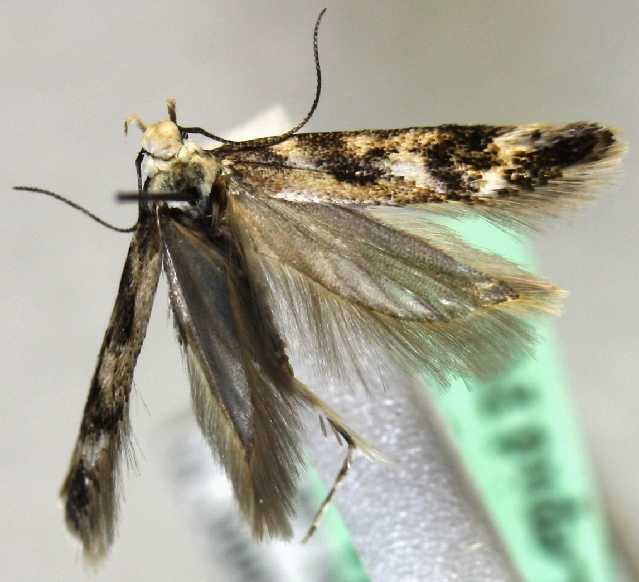

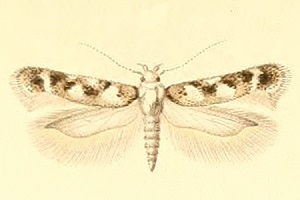

Scientific classification
- Domain: Eukaryota
- Kingdom: Animalia
- Phylum: Arthropoda
- Class: Insecta
- Order: Lepidoptera
- Family: Gelechiidae
- Genus: Caryocolum
- Species: C. delphinatella

Binomial name
- Caryocolum delphinatella (Constant, 1890)

Synonyms
- Lita delphinatella Constant, 1890; Gnorimoschema fiorii Klimesch, 1953; Caryocolum fiorii

= Caryocolum delphinatella =

Species of moth

Caryocolum delphinatella is a moth of the family Gelechiidae. It is found in Abruzzi, the south-western Alps (Alpes-Maritimes, Alpes-de-Haute-Provence, Hautes-Alpes, Isère, Walliser Alpen, Alpi Cozie) and the Pyrenees (Haute-Garonne).

The length of the forewings is 7–7.5 mm for males and 6.5–7 mm for females. Adults have been recorded on wing from July to early August.

The larvae probably feed on Minuartia and Silene species.
