= Caryocolum provinciella =

Scientific classification
- Kingdom: Animalia
- Phylum: Arthropoda
- Clade: Pancrustacea
- Class: Insecta
- Order: Lepidoptera
- Family: Gelechiidae
- Genus: Caryocolum
- Species: C. provinciella

Binomial name
- Caryocolum provinciella (Stainton, 1869)

Synonyms
- Gelechia provinciella Stainton, 1869; Lita provinciella; Phthorimaea provinciella; Gnorimoschema provinciellum

Species of moth

Caryocolum provinciella is a moth of the family Gelechiidae. It is found in Greece, France, Spain, Portugal and Morocco.

The length of the forewings is 5–6 mm. Adults have been recorded on wing from April to May and in August. There are two generations per year.

The larvae probably feed on Silene nicaensis and Herniaria species. Larvae can be found from September to March and in June.
