= Caryocolum moehringiae =

Scientific classification
- Kingdom: Animalia
- Phylum: Arthropoda
- Clade: Pancrustacea
- Class: Insecta
- Order: Lepidoptera
- Family: Gelechiidae
- Genus: Caryocolum
- Species: C. moehringiae

Binomial name
- Caryocolum moehringiae (Klimesch, 1954)

Synonyms
- Gnorimoschema moehringiae Klimesch, 1954

Species of moth

Caryocolum moehringiae is a moth of the family Gelechiidae. It is found from Germany to the Pyrenees, Italy and Greece.

The length of the forewings is 5.5–6 mm. Adults have been recorded on wing from early June to late August.

The larvae feed on Moehringia muscosa and Moehringia bavarica. Young larvae mine the leaves of their host plant. Larvae can be found from April to May.
