= Caryocolum transiens =

Scientific classification
- Domain: Eukaryota
- Kingdom: Animalia
- Phylum: Arthropoda
- Class: Insecta
- Order: Lepidoptera
- Family: Gelechiidae
- Genus: Caryocolum
- Species: C. transiens

Binomial name
- Caryocolum transiens Huemer, 1992

Species of moth

Caryocolum transiens is a moth of the family Gelechiidae. It is found in Nepal.

The length of the forewings is about 6 mm. The ground colour of the forewings is dark brown and the hindwings are shining grey. The larvae possibly feed on Cerastium and/or Stellaria species.
