= Caryocolum iranicum =

Scientific classification
- Kingdom: Animalia
- Phylum: Arthropoda
- Clade: Pancrustacea
- Class: Insecta
- Order: Lepidoptera
- Family: Gelechiidae
- Genus: Caryocolum
- Species: C. iranicum

Binomial name
- Caryocolum iranicum Huemer, 1989

Species of moth

Caryocolum iranicum is a moth of the family Gelechiidae. It is found in Turkey (Anatolia) and western Iran.
