= Caryocolum jaspidella =

Scientific classification
- Domain: Eukaryota
- Kingdom: Animalia
- Phylum: Arthropoda
- Class: Insecta
- Order: Lepidoptera
- Family: Gelechiidae
- Genus: Caryocolum
- Species: C. jaspidella

Binomial name
- Caryocolum jaspidella (Chretien, 1908)

Synonyms
- Lita jaspidella Chretien, 1908; Phthorimaea jaspidella; Caryocolum jaspidellum

Species of moth

Caryocolum jaspidella is a moth of the family Gelechiidae. It is found in Portugal, Spain and Algeria.

The length of the forewings is 4–5 mm. Adults have been recorded on wing in late August.
