= Caryocolum bosalella =

Scientific classification
- Domain: Eukaryota
- Kingdom: Animalia
- Phylum: Arthropoda
- Class: Insecta
- Order: Lepidoptera
- Family: Gelechiidae
- Genus: Caryocolum
- Species: C. bosalella

Binomial name
- Caryocolum bosalella (Rebel, 1936)

Synonyms
- Lita bosalella Rebel, 1936; Gnorimoschema bosalellum

Species of moth

Caryocolum bosalella is a moth of the family Gelechiidae. It is found on Corsica and Sardinia.

The length of the forewings is about 5 mm for males and females. Adults are on wing from early August to early September.
