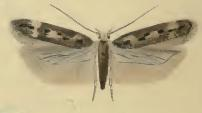

Scientific classification
- Domain: Eukaryota
- Kingdom: Animalia
- Phylum: Arthropoda
- Class: Insecta
- Order: Lepidoptera
- Family: Gelechiidae
- Genus: Caryocolum
- Species: C. cauligenella

Binomial name
- Caryocolum cauligenella (Schmid, 1863)

Synonyms
- Gelechia cauligenella Schmid, 1863; Caryocolum cauligenellum

= Caryocolum cauligenella =

Species of moth

Caryocolum cauligenella is a moth of the family Gelechiidae. It is found in most of Europe, except Ireland, Great Britain, Norway and most of the Balkan Peninsula.

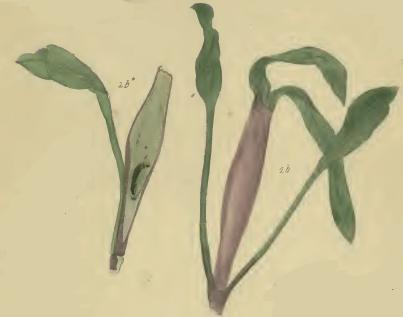
A swollen stem of Silene nutans (2b); swollen stem sectioned, showing the larva within (2b*)

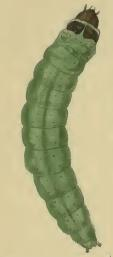
Larva

The wingspan is 11–13 mm. Adults are on wing in June.

The larvae feed on Silene species, including Silene gallica, Silene nutans and Silene vulgaris. They initially feed inside stem galls on their host plant. Pupation takes place outside of the gall in a white spinning in the soil.
