= Caryocolum repentis =

Scientific classification
- Kingdom: Animalia
- Phylum: Arthropoda
- Clade: Pancrustacea
- Class: Insecta
- Order: Lepidoptera
- Family: Gelechiidae
- Genus: Caryocolum
- Species: C. repentis

Binomial name
- Caryocolum repentis Huemer & Luquet, 1992

Species of moth

Caryocolum repentis is a moth of the family Gelechiidae. It is found in Spain, France, Germany, Austria, Switzerland, Italy, Slovenia and Russia (the southern Ural).

The length of the forewings is 5–5.5 mm (0.20–0.22 in) for males and 4.5–5 mm (0.18–0.20 in) for females.

The larvae feed on Gypsophila repens. Young larvae mine the leaves of their host plant. Larvae can be found from May to late June.
