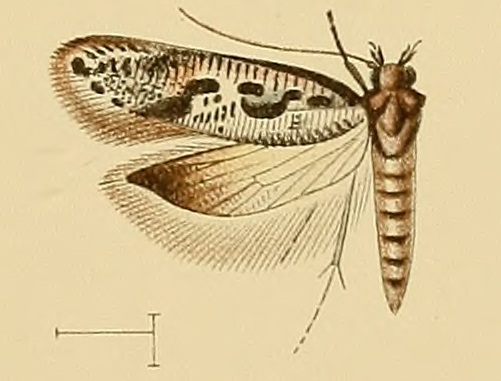

Scientific classification
- Domain: Eukaryota
- Kingdom: Animalia
- Phylum: Arthropoda
- Class: Insecta
- Order: Lepidoptera
- Family: Gelechiidae
- Genus: Caryocolum
- Species: C. sciurella

Binomial name
- Caryocolum sciurella (Walsingham, 1908)

Synonyms
- Gelechia sciurella Walsingham, 1908; Phthorimaea sciurella; Lita rubidella Chretien, 1908; Lita rubidellum

= Caryocolum sciurella =

Species of moth

Caryocolum sciurella is a moth of the family Gelechiidae. It is found on the Canary Islands and Madeira.

The wingspan is 10–12 mm. Adults are on wing from late February to mid-April.
