= Caryocolum albifaciella =

Scientific classification
- Kingdom: Animalia
- Phylum: Arthropoda
- Clade: Pancrustacea
- Class: Insecta
- Order: Lepidoptera
- Family: Gelechiidae
- Genus: Caryocolum
- Species: C. albifaciella

Binomial name
- Caryocolum albifaciella (Heinemann, 1870)

Synonyms
- Gelechia albifaciella Heinemann, 1870; Gelechia albifasciella; Lita behenella Constant, 1890

Species of moth

Caryocolum albifaciella is a moth of the family Gelechiidae. It is found in the Alps (France, Germany, Austria and Switzerland) and the Massif Central.

The length of the forewings is 6.5–7.5 mm for males and 6.4–7 mm for females. Adults have been recorded on wing from the end of June to the beginning of September.

The larvae feed on Silene vulgaris and Silene baccifera. They spin together the leaves of their host plant. They also bore the flower buds.
