= Caryocolum protectum =

Scientific classification
- Domain: Eukaryota
- Kingdom: Animalia
- Phylum: Arthropoda
- Class: Insecta
- Order: Lepidoptera
- Family: Gelechiidae
- Genus: Caryocolum
- Species: C. protectum

Binomial name
- Caryocolum protectum (Braun, 1965)

Synonyms
- Gnorimoschema protecta Braun, 1965; Caryocolum protecta

Species of moth

Caryocolum protectum is a moth of the family Gelechiidae. It is found in Kentucky, United States.

The length of the forewings is about 6 mm. Adults have been recorded on wing from early May to mid-July.
