= Caryocolum confluens =

Scientific classification
- Kingdom: Animalia
- Phylum: Arthropoda
- Clade: Pancrustacea
- Class: Insecta
- Order: Lepidoptera
- Family: Gelechiidae
- Genus: Caryocolum
- Species: C. confluens

Binomial name
- Caryocolum confluens Huemer, 1988

Species of moth

Caryocolum confluens is a moth of the family Gelechiidae. It is found in Greece. The length of the forewings is about 6 mm. Adults have been recorded on wing from late June to early July.
