= Caryocolum klosi =

Scientific classification
- Domain: Eukaryota
- Kingdom: Animalia
- Phylum: Arthropoda
- Class: Insecta
- Order: Lepidoptera
- Family: Gelechiidae
- Genus: Caryocolum
- Species: C. klosi

Binomial name
- Caryocolum klosi (Rebel, 1917)

Synonyms
- Gelechia klosi Rebel, 1917; Phthorimaea klosi

Species of moth

Caryocolum klosi is a moth of the family Gelechiidae. It is found in France, Austria, Germany, Italy, the Czech Republic and Romania.

The length of the forewings is 6.5–8 mm for males and 6.5-7.5 mm for females. Adults have been recorded on wing from late June to late July.

The larvae feed on Stellaria nemorum. They feed between the spun shoots of their host plant. Pupation takes place from May to June. Larvae can be found in April.
