= Caryocolum horoscopa =

Scientific classification
- Kingdom: Animalia
- Phylum: Arthropoda
- Class: Insecta
- Order: Lepidoptera
- Family: Gelechiidae
- Genus: Caryocolum
- Species: C. horoscopa

Binomial name
- Caryocolum horoscopa (Meyrick, 1926)

Synonyms
- Phthorimaea horoscopa Meyrick, 1926

Species of moth

Caryocolum horoscopa is a moth of the family Gelechiidae. It is found in India (Kashmir), Afghanistan and Turkey.

The length of the forewings is 5–6 mm. Adults have been recorded on wing from July to early August.
