= Caryocolum oculatella =

Scientific classification
- Domain: Eukaryota
- Kingdom: Animalia
- Phylum: Arthropoda
- Class: Insecta
- Order: Lepidoptera
- Family: Gelechiidae
- Genus: Caryocolum
- Species: C. oculatella

Binomial name
- Caryocolum oculatella (Thomann, 1930)

Synonyms
- Lita oculatella Thomann, 1930; Phthorimaea oculatella; Gnorimoschema oculatellum; Caryocolum oculatellum; Lita ochraceella Thomann, 1929

Species of moth

Caryocolum oculatella is a moth of the family Gelechiidae. It is found in Austria and Switzerland.

The length of the forewings is 5-5.5 mm. Adults have been recorded on wing from late June to early July.

The larvae feed on Gypsophila repens. They feed between spun terminal shoots.
