= Caryocolum similellum =

Scientific classification
- Kingdom: Animalia
- Phylum: Arthropoda
- Clade: Pancrustacea
- Class: Insecta
- Order: Lepidoptera
- Family: Gelechiidae
- Genus: Caryocolum
- Species: C. similellum

Binomial name
- Caryocolum similellum Huemer, 1989

Species of moth

Caryocolum similellum is a moth of the family Gelechiidae. It is found in northern Iran.

The length of the forewings is about 5 mm. The ground colour of the forewings is dark brown and the hindwings are shining grey. Adults have been recorded on wing mid-June.
