= Caryocolum baischi =

Scientific classification
- Kingdom: Animalia
- Phylum: Arthropoda
- Clade: Pancrustacea
- Class: Insecta
- Order: Lepidoptera
- Family: Gelechiidae
- Genus: Caryocolum
- Species: C. baischi

Binomial name
- Caryocolum baischi Huemer & Karsholt, 2010

Species of moth

Caryocolum baischi is a moth of the family Gelechiidae. It is found in Greece.

== Etymology ==
The species is named in honour of Günter Baisch, who collected the first specimens of this species.
