= Caryocolum splendens =

Scientific classification
- Domain: Eukaryota
- Kingdom: Animalia
- Phylum: Arthropoda
- Class: Insecta
- Order: Lepidoptera
- Family: Gelechiidae
- Genus: Caryocolum
- Species: C. splendens

Binomial name
- Caryocolum splendens Povolny, 1977

Species of moth

Caryocolum splendens is a moth of the family Gelechiidae. It is found in Iran.

The length of the forewings is about 5 mm. Adults have been recorded on wing in early July.
