= Caryocolum laceratella =

Scientific classification
- Kingdom: Animalia
- Phylum: Arthropoda
- Clade: Pancrustacea
- Class: Insecta
- Order: Lepidoptera
- Family: Gelechiidae
- Genus: Caryocolum
- Species: C. laceratella

Binomial name
- Caryocolum laceratella (Zeller, 1868)

Synonyms
- Gelechia laceratella Zeller, 1868; Lita thurneri Pinker, 1953; Gnorimoschema thurneri; Caryocolum thurneri

Species of moth

Caryocolum laceratella is a moth of the family Gelechiidae. It is found in Slovenia and Italy.

The length of the forewings is 7.5-8.5 mm. Adults have been recorded on wing from late July to mid-September.

Pupae have been found from the end of August to mid-September close to Moehringia ciliata, which is possibly the host plant.
