= Caryocolum albithoracellum =

Scientific classification
- Kingdom: Animalia
- Phylum: Arthropoda
- Clade: Pancrustacea
- Class: Insecta
- Order: Lepidoptera
- Family: Gelechiidae
- Genus: Caryocolum
- Species: C. albithoracellum

Binomial name
- Caryocolum albithoracellum Huemer, 1989

Species of moth

Caryocolum albithoracellum is a moth of the family Gelechiidae. It is found in Turkey (Anatolia).

The length of the forewings is about 5 mm. Adults have been recorded on wing from July to September.
