= Caryocolum nepalense =

Scientific classification
- Domain: Eukaryota
- Kingdom: Animalia
- Phylum: Arthropoda
- Class: Insecta
- Order: Lepidoptera
- Family: Gelechiidae
- Genus: Caryocolum
- Species: C. nepalense

Binomial name
- Caryocolum nepalense Povolny, 1968

Species of moth

Caryocolum nepalense is a moth of the family Gelechiidae. It is found in Nepal. It occurs at altitudes between 1,500 and 3,800 meters (4,900 and 12,500 ft).

The length of the forewings is 5.5–6.5 mm (0.22–0.26 in) for males and 5–6 mm (0.20–0.24 in) for females. Adults have been recorded on wing from early April to early July and from late October to early November, possibly in two generations per year.
