= Caryocolum cassella =

Scientific classification
- Kingdom: Animalia
- Phylum: Arthropoda
- Class: Insecta
- Order: Lepidoptera
- Family: Gelechiidae
- Genus: Caryocolum
- Species: C. cassella

Binomial name
- Caryocolum cassella (Walker, 1864)

Synonyms
- Gelechia cassella Walker, 1864; Caryocolum cassellum; Gelechia (Lita) melanotephrella Erschoff, 1877; Lita melanotephrella; Phthorimaea melanotephrella; Lita albifasciella Toll, 1936; Gnorimoschema albifasciellum; Caryocolum albifasciellum; Phthorimaea subvicinella Hackman, 1946; Caryocolum subvicinellum; Caryocolum falellum Piskunov, 1975

Species of moth

Caryocolum cassella is a moth of the family Gelechiidae. It is found in the France, Germany, Austria, Switzerland, Denmark, Scandinavia, Poland, the Czech Republic, Slovakia, Romania, Estonia, Lithuania, Ukraine, Belarus and Russia. It is also found in North America, where it has been recorded from Alberta, Saskatchewan, California and Nevada. A record from Hokkaido, Japan might also refer to this species.

The length of the forewings is 5.5-6.5 mm for males and 5.5–6 mm for females. Adults have been recorded on wing from June to late August.

The larvae feed on Stellaria nemorum. They feed between spun shoots. Larvae can be found from May to June.
