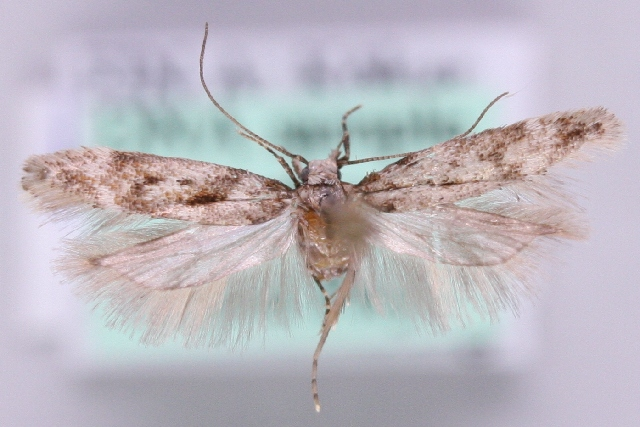

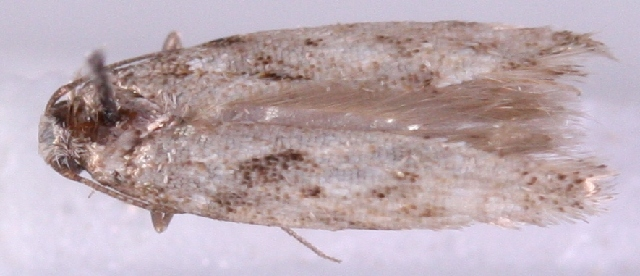

Scientific classification
- Kingdom: Animalia
- Phylum: Arthropoda
- Clade: Pancrustacea
- Class: Insecta
- Order: Lepidoptera
- Family: Gelechiidae
- Genus: Caryocolum
- Species: C. blandelloides

Binomial name
- Caryocolum blandelloides Karsholt, 1981

= Caryocolum blandelloides =

Species of moth

Caryocolum blandelloides is a moth of the family Gelechiidae. It is found in Great Britain, Spain, Germany, Austria, Switzerland, Italy, Denmark, Scandinavia, Czech Republic, Slovakia, Estonia, Poland, Ukraine, Russia and Greece, as well as on Corsica, Sardinia and Crete.

The length of the forewings is 4.5–6 mm for males and 4–5.5 mm for females. Adults have been recorded on wing from late July to early August.

The larvae feed on Cerastium arvense strictum and possibly Cerastium semidecandrum.
