= Caryocolum leucothoracellum =

Scientific classification
- Kingdom: Animalia
- Phylum: Arthropoda
- Clade: Pancrustacea
- Class: Insecta
- Order: Lepidoptera
- Family: Gelechiidae
- Genus: Caryocolum
- Species: C. leucothoracellum

Binomial name
- Caryocolum leucothoracellum (Klimesch, 1953)

Synonyms
- Gnorimoschema leucothoracellum Klimesch, 1953; Caryocolum leucothoracella

Species of moth

Caryocolum leucothoracellum is a moth of the family Gelechiidae. It is found in France, Austria, Switzerland, Italy, Hungary and Morocco.

The length of the forewings is 4–5 mm for males and 4.5–6 mm for females. Adults have been recorded on wing from late June to late October, probably in one generation per year.
