= Caryocolum simulans =

Scientific classification
- Kingdom: Animalia
- Phylum: Arthropoda
- Clade: Pancrustacea
- Class: Insecta
- Order: Lepidoptera
- Family: Gelechiidae
- Genus: Caryocolum
- Species: C. simulans

Binomial name
- Caryocolum simulans Huemer, 1988

Species of moth

Caryocolum simulans is a moth of the family Gelechiidae. It is found in Syria.

The length of the forewings is 5–6 mm.
