= Caryocolum majus =

Scientific classification
- Kingdom: Animalia
- Phylum: Arthropoda
- Clade: Pancrustacea
- Class: Insecta
- Order: Lepidoptera
- Family: Gelechiidae
- Genus: Caryocolum
- Species: C. majus

Binomial name
- Caryocolum majus Huemer, 1988

Species of moth

Caryocolum majus is a moth of the family Gelechiidae. It is found in Afghanistan.

The length of the forewings is about 6 millimetres (0.24 in). Adults have been recorded on wing from mid-June to late July.
