= Caryocolum hispanicum =

Scientific classification
- Kingdom: Animalia
- Phylum: Arthropoda
- Clade: Pancrustacea
- Class: Insecta
- Order: Lepidoptera
- Family: Gelechiidae
- Genus: Caryocolum
- Species: C. hispanicum

Binomial name
- Caryocolum hispanicum Huemer, 1988

Species of moth

Caryocolum hispanicum is a moth of the family Gelechiidae. It is found in Spain and Greece.

The length of the forewings is about 5.5 mm for males and 5 mm for females. Adults have been recorded on wing in July.
