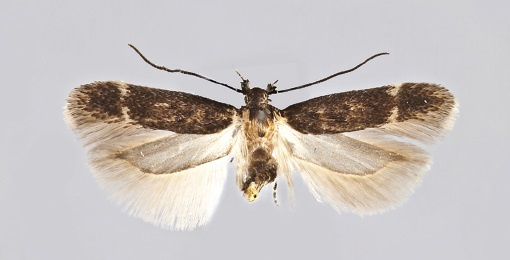
- Female
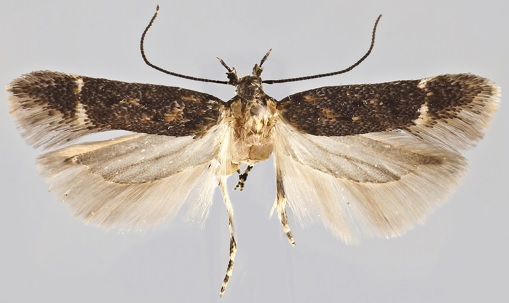
- Male

Scientific classification
- Kingdom: Animalia
- Phylum: Arthropoda
- Clade: Pancrustacea
- Class: Insecta
- Order: Lepidoptera
- Family: Gelechiidae
- Genus: Caryocolum
- Species: C. crypticum

Binomial name
- Caryocolum crypticum Huemer, Karsholt & Mutanen, 2014

= Caryocolum crypticum =

Species of moth

Caryocolum crypticum is a moth of the family Gelechiidae. It is found in widely separated localities in northern Italy, Switzerland and Greece. The habitat consists of xerophilous steppes and rocky areas with sparse vegetation from about 500 to 1,300 meters.

The wingspan is 10.5–14 mm. The forewings are blackish brown, mottled with some rusty brown, particularly in the proximal half. There are supplementary black spots in the fold and in the cell. The costal and tornal spot are small, cream and separated. The hindwings are light grey. Adults are on wing from early July to September.

The larvae feed on Silene otites and Silene nutans. They feed in the stem of their host plant. Larvae can be found in early spring.

== Etymology ==
The species name refers to the cryptic morphology of the species and is derived from the Latinized adjective crypticus.
