= Caryocolum saginella =

Scientific classification
- Kingdom: Animalia
- Phylum: Arthropoda
- Clade: Pancrustacea
- Class: Insecta
- Order: Lepidoptera
- Family: Gelechiidae
- Genus: Caryocolum
- Species: C. saginella

Binomial name
- Caryocolum saginella (Zeller, 1868)

Synonyms
- Gelechia saginella Zeller, 1868; Lita saginella; Phthorimaea saginella; Caryocolum saginellum; Lita coussonella Chretien, 1908; Phthorimaea coussonella

Species of moth

Caryocolum saginella is a moth of the family Gelechiidae. It is found in France, Austria, Switzerland, Italy, Croatia, Slovenia, North Macedonia and Greece.

The length of the forewings is 4.5–5 mm for males and 4–5 mm for females. Adults have been recorded on wing from early June to late July.

The larvae feed on Silene saxifraga and Silene linoides.
