= Caryocolum immixtum =

Scientific classification
- Kingdom: Animalia
- Phylum: Arthropoda
- Clade: Pancrustacea
- Class: Insecta
- Order: Lepidoptera
- Family: Gelechiidae
- Genus: Caryocolum
- Species: C. immixtum

Binomial name
- Caryocolum immixtum Huemer, 1988

Species of moth

Caryocolum immixtum is a moth of the family Gelechiidae. It is found in Afghanistan.

The length of the forewings is about 5 mm for males and about 4.5 mm for females. Adults have been recorded on wing from late May to late June.
