= Caryocolum nearcticum =

Scientific classification
- Kingdom: Animalia
- Phylum: Arthropoda
- Clade: Pancrustacea
- Class: Insecta
- Order: Lepidoptera
- Family: Gelechiidae
- Genus: Caryocolum
- Species: C. nearcticum

Binomial name
- Caryocolum nearcticum Huemer, 1988

Species of moth

Caryocolum nearcticum is a moth of the family Gelechiidae. It is found in the United States, from California to Washington.

The length of the forewings is 5–5.5 mm. Adults have been recorded on wing from late July to early September.
