= Caryocolum peregrinella =

Scientific classification
- Domain: Eukaryota
- Kingdom: Animalia
- Phylum: Arthropoda
- Class: Insecta
- Order: Lepidoptera
- Family: Gelechiidae
- Genus: Caryocolum
- Species: C. peregrinella

Binomial name
- Caryocolum peregrinella (Herrich-Schaffer, 1854)

Synonyms
- Gelechia peregrinella Herrich-Schaffer, 1854; Gelechia melantypella Mann, 1877; Caryocolum melantypellum

Species of moth

Caryocolum peregrinella is a moth of the family Gelechiidae. It is found in northern Spain, the southern Alps (France, Italy, Slovenia and Austria), Bosnia and Herzegovina, North Macedonia and Greece.

The length of the forewings is 7.5–8 mm for males and 7.5–9 mm for females. Adults have been recorded on wing from mid-July to mid-September.

The larvae feed on the leaves of Silene ciliata and Petrocoptis pyrenaica. Larvae can be found in mid-June.
