= Caryocolum mazeli =

Scientific classification
- Kingdom: Animalia
- Phylum: Arthropoda
- Clade: Pancrustacea
- Class: Insecta
- Order: Lepidoptera
- Family: Gelechiidae
- Genus: Caryocolum
- Species: C. mazeli

Binomial name
- Caryocolum mazeli Huemer & Nel, 2005

Species of moth

Caryocolum mazeli is a moth of the family Gelechiidae. It is known from the French Alps and from Pyrenees of southern France and Andorra. It likely occurs in adjacent Spain and Italy. It is named for Robert Mazel, French lepidopterologist.

The wingspan is 12–13.5 mm (0.47–0.53 in). The larvae possibly feed on Dianthus and/or Petrorhagia species, as is known for other Caryocolum.
