= Caryocolum tetrameris =

Scientific classification
- Kingdom: Animalia
- Phylum: Arthropoda
- Class: Insecta
- Order: Lepidoptera
- Family: Gelechiidae
- Genus: Caryocolum
- Species: C. tetrameris

Binomial name
- Caryocolum tetrameris (Meyrick, 1926)

Synonyms
- Gelechia tetrameris Meyrick, 1926; Gnorimoschema tetrameris

Species of moth

Caryocolum tetrameris is a moth of the family Gelechiidae. It is found in Turkey, Iran and Afghanistan.

The length of the forewings is 6–7 mm for males and about 7 mm for females. Adults have been recorded on wing from June to mid August.
