= Caryocolum fibigerium =

Scientific classification
- Kingdom: Animalia
- Phylum: Arthropoda
- Clade: Pancrustacea
- Class: Insecta
- Order: Lepidoptera
- Family: Gelechiidae
- Genus: Caryocolum
- Species: C. fibigerium

Binomial name
- Caryocolum fibigerium Huemer, 1988

Species of moth

Caryocolum fibigerium is a moth of the family Gelechiidae. It is found in Portugal, Spain, France, Italy, Bulgaria, Greece and Morocco.

The length of the forewings is 4.5-5.5 mm for males and 4-5.5 mm for females. Adults have been recorded on wing in late April at lower altitudes and from July to early October in mountainous areas.

The larvae feed on Arenaria montana. Older larvae live between two spun leaves. Larvae can be found from November to mid-December.
