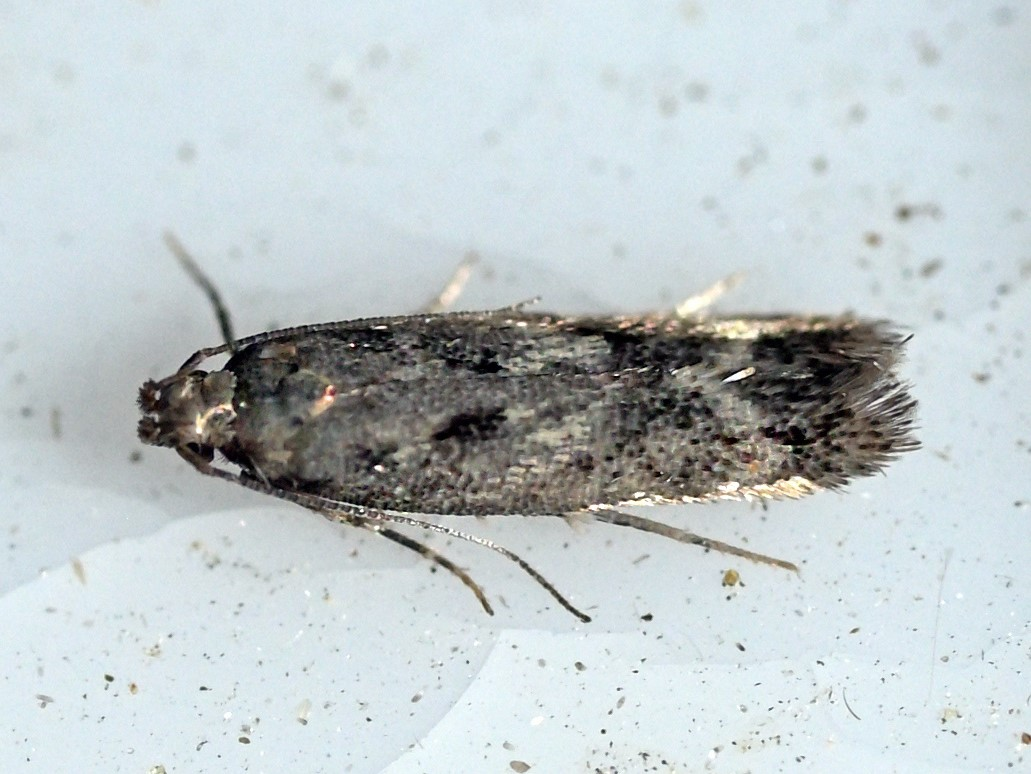

Scientific classification
- Kingdom: Animalia
- Phylum: Arthropoda
- Class: Insecta
- Order: Lepidoptera
- Family: Gelechiidae
- Genus: Caryocolum
- Species: C. pullatella

Binomial name
- Caryocolum pullatella (Tengstrom, 1848)

Synonyms
- Gelechia pullatella Tengstrom, 1848; Gelechia pulla Tengstrom, 1848; Gelechia subtractella Walker, 1864; Lita alsinella var. livoniella Teich, 1889; Gelechia agricolaris Meyrick, 1933

= Caryocolum pullatella =

Species of moth

Caryocolum pullatella is a species of moth in the family Gelechiidae. It is found in Europe (Austria, Italy, Denmark, Poland, Estonia, Latvia, Norway, Sweden, Finland, Ukraine, Russia), Japan, and in North America (Canada, United States), south to Arizona in the west.

The length of the forewings is 5-6.5 mm. Adults have been recorded on wing from mid-May to mid-October, probably in one generation per year.
