= Caryocolum huebneri =

Scientific classification
- Kingdom: Animalia
- Phylum: Arthropoda
- Clade: Pancrustacea
- Class: Insecta
- Order: Lepidoptera
- Family: Gelechiidae
- Genus: Caryocolum
- Species: C. huebneri

Binomial name
- Caryocolum huebneri (Haworth, 1829)

Synonyms
- Recurvaria huebneri Haworth, 1829; Gelechia hubnerella Doubleday, 1859; Gelechia knaggsiella Stainton 1866; Caryocolum knaggsiella

Species of moth

Caryocolum huebneri is a moth of the family Gelechiidae. It is found in most of Europe, except Ireland, the Netherlands, the Iberian Peninsula, Norway, Finland, Estonia, Lithuania, and most of the Balkan Peninsula. In the east, the range extends to the Ural Mountains.

The wingspan is 9–12 mm. Adults have been recorded on wing from mid-July to late August.

The larvae feed on the shoots of Stellaria holostea. Larvae can be found in May.
