= Caryocolum leucomelanella =

Scientific classification
- Kingdom: Animalia
- Phylum: Arthropoda
- Clade: Pancrustacea
- Class: Insecta
- Order: Lepidoptera
- Family: Gelechiidae
- Genus: Caryocolum
- Species: C. leucomelanella

Binomial name
- Caryocolum leucomelanella (Zeller, 1839)

Synonyms
- Gelechia leucomelanella Zeller, 1839; Lita leucomelanella; Phthorimaea leucomelanella; Gnorimoschema leucomelanellum; Gelechia gypsophilae Stainton, 1869; Lita gypsophilae; Caryocolum leucomelanellum; Gnorimoschema gypsophilae; Caryocolum gypsophilae

Species of moth

Caryocolum leucomelanella is a moth of the family Gelechiidae. It is found in most of Europe, except Ireland, Great Britain, the Benelux, Portugal, Fennoscandia and the Baltic region. It is also found in Russia (the Ural Mountains and Siberia: Altai, Transbaikalia and Tuva).

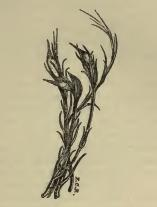
Mine

The length of the forewings is 3.5–5 mm for males and 4-5.5 mm for females.

The larvae feed on Petrorhagia saxifraga, Dianthus carthusianorum, Dianthus sylvestris and possibly Dianthus gratianopolitanus and Dianthus seguieri. Pupation takes place in a cocoon on the ground at the end of April. Larvae can be found from the beginning of May to June.
