= Caryocolum vartianorum =

Scientific classification
- Kingdom: Animalia
- Phylum: Arthropoda
- Clade: Pancrustacea
- Class: Insecta
- Order: Lepidoptera
- Family: Gelechiidae
- Genus: Caryocolum
- Species: C. vartianorum

Binomial name
- Caryocolum vartianorum Huemer, 1988

Species of moth

Caryocolum vartianorum is a moth of the family Gelechiidae. It is found in Afghanistan. It occurs at altitudes between 2,100 and 2,500 meters.

The length of the forewings is about 6 mm. Adults have been recorded on wing from late July to early August.
