= Caryocolum dauphini =

Scientific classification
- Domain: Eukaryota
- Kingdom: Animalia
- Phylum: Arthropoda
- Class: Insecta
- Order: Lepidoptera
- Family: Gelechiidae
- Genus: Caryocolum
- Species: C. dauphini

Binomial name
- Caryocolum dauphini Grange & Nel, 2012

Species of moth

Caryocolum dauphini is a moth of the family Gelechiidae. It is found in the south-eastern Alps.
