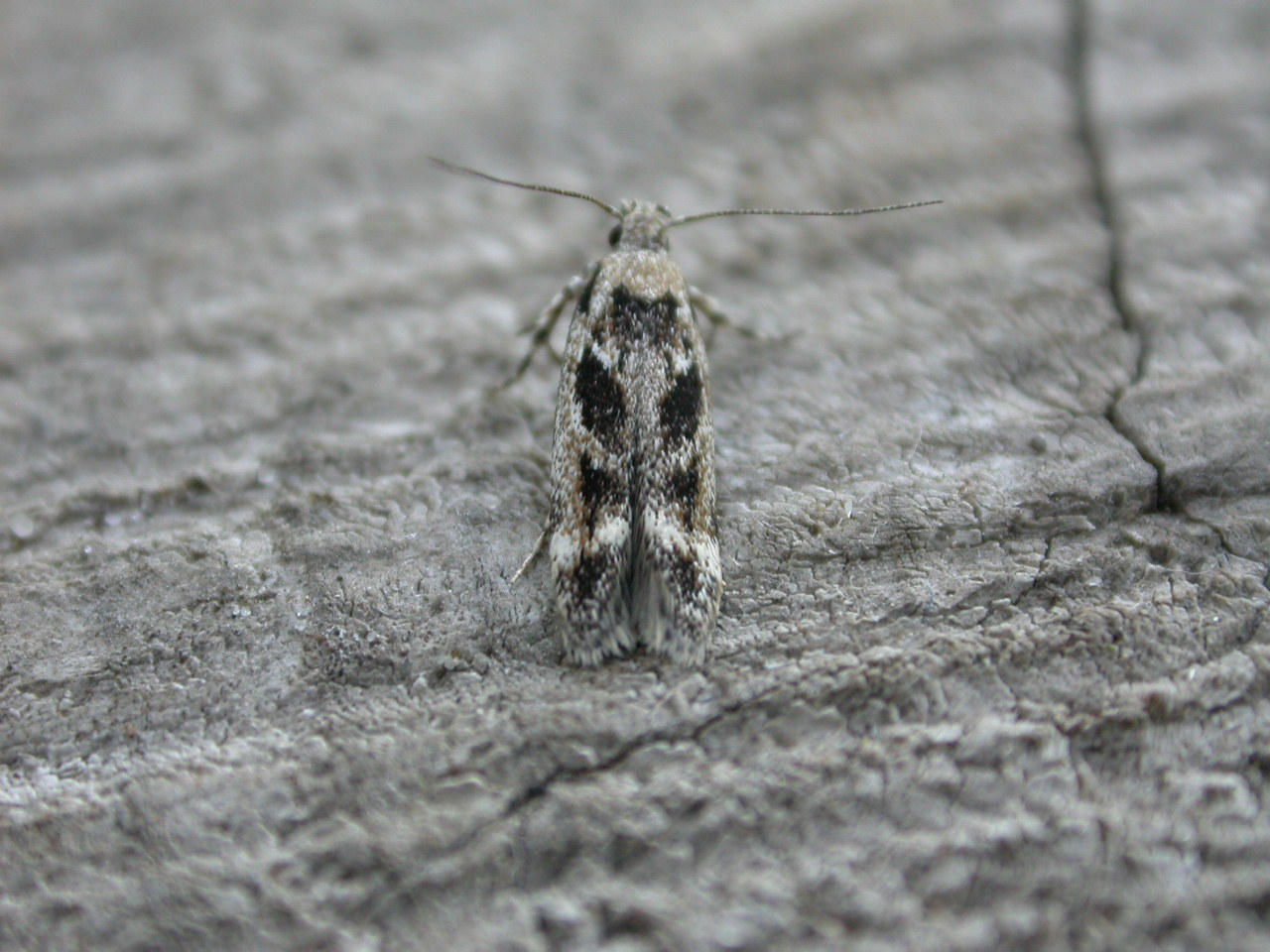

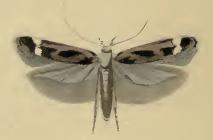

Scientific classification
- Domain: Eukaryota
- Kingdom: Animalia
- Phylum: Arthropoda
- Class: Insecta
- Order: Lepidoptera
- Family: Gelechiidae
- Genus: Caryocolum
- Species: C. fischerella

Binomial name
- Caryocolum fischerella (Treitschke, 1833)

Synonyms
- Lita fischerella Treitschke, 1833; Gelechia fischerella; Phthorimaea fischerella; Gnorimoschema fischerellum; Caryocolum fischeriella; Caryocolum fischerellum

= Caryocolum fischerella =

Species of moth

Caryocolum fischerella is a moth of the family Gelechiidae. It is found in central and northern Europe.

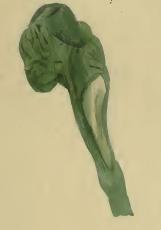
A shoot of Saponaria officinalis with leaves spun together

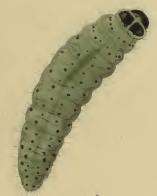
Larva

The wingspan is 11–13 mm. The forewings are mid-brown. The moths are on wing from June to July depending on the location.

The larvae feed on Saponaria officinalis and Saponaria ocymoides. They are gregarious and feed within spun terminal shoots of their host plant. The larvae can be found in May. Pupation takes place in a web between the leaves of the host plant.
