= Caryocolum afghanum =

Scientific classification
- Kingdom: Animalia
- Phylum: Arthropoda
- Clade: Pancrustacea
- Class: Insecta
- Order: Lepidoptera
- Family: Gelechiidae
- Genus: Caryocolum
- Species: C. afghanum

Binomial name
- Caryocolum afghanum Huemer, 1988

Species of moth

Caryocolum afghanum is a moth of the family Gelechiidae. It is found in Afghanistan.

The length of the forewings is 5-5.5 mm for males and 4.5–5 mm for females. Adults have been recorded on wing from mid-June to early August.
