= Caryocolum inflativorella =

Scientific classification
- Kingdom: Animalia
- Phylum: Arthropoda
- Clade: Pancrustacea
- Class: Insecta
- Order: Lepidoptera
- Family: Gelechiidae
- Genus: Caryocolum
- Species: C. inflativorella

Binomial name
- Caryocolum inflativorella (Klimesch, 1938)

Synonyms
- Lita inflativorella Klimesch, 1938; Gnorimoschema inflativorella; Lita xuthella Rebel, 1940; Caryocolum xuthellum; Gnorimoschema census Gozmany, 1954

Species of moth

Caryocolum inflativorella is a moth of the family Gelechiidae. It is found in Slovakia, Hungary, Romania and North Macedonia.

The length of the forewings is 5.5–8 mm for males and 6–7 mm for females. Adults have been recorded on wing from late June to mid-August.

The larvae feed on Silene vulgaris. Larvae can be found in June.
