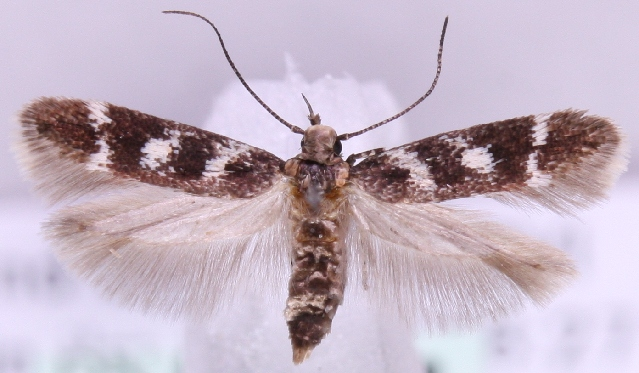

Scientific classification
- Domain: Eukaryota
- Kingdom: Animalia
- Phylum: Arthropoda
- Class: Insecta
- Order: Lepidoptera
- Family: Gelechiidae
- Genus: Caryocolum
- Species: C. schleichi

Binomial name
- Caryocolum schleichi (Christoph, 1872)

Synonyms
- Lita schleichi Christoph, 1872; Caryocolum hackeri Derra, 1985; Caryocolum syriacum Povolny, 1977; Lita dianthella Chretien, 1925; Caryocolum dianthella; Lita improvisella Rebel, 1936; Caryocolum improvisella; Lita arenariella Benander, 1937; Caryocolum arenariella

= Caryocolum schleichi =

Species of moth

Caryocolum schleichi is a moth of the family Gelechiidae. It is found in central, most of western and parts of eastern Europe, Morocco, Turkey, Syria, Afghanistan and Mongolia.

The length of the forewings is 4–7 mm for males and 3.5–6 mm for females. Adults have been recorded on wing from late May to early October.

The larvae feed on Dianthus scaber toletanus, Dianthus deltoides, Dianthus arenarius and Dianthus sylvestris.

== Subspecies ==
- Caryocolum schleichi schleichi
- Caryocolum schleichi dianthella (Chretien, 1925)
- Caryocolum schleichi improvisella (Rebel, 1936)
- Caryocolum schleichi arenariella (Benander, 1937)
