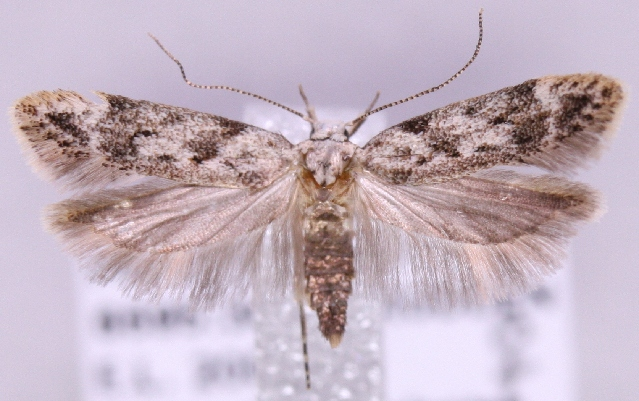

Scientific classification
- Domain: Eukaryota
- Kingdom: Animalia
- Phylum: Arthropoda
- Class: Insecta
- Order: Lepidoptera
- Family: Gelechiidae
- Genus: Caryocolum
- Species: C. kroesmanniella

Binomial name
- Caryocolum kroesmanniella (Herrich-Schäffer, 1854)

Synonyms
- Gelechia kroesmanniella Herrich-Schäffer, 1854

= Caryocolum kroesmanniella =

Species of moth

Caryocolum kroesmanniella is a moth of the family Gelechiidae. It is found from Fennoscandia to the Pyrenees, Alps and Romania and from Great Britain to southern Russia (the Ural Mountains). The habitat consists of open woodland.

The length of the forewings is 5.5–6.5 mm for males and 6–7 mm for females. Adults have been recorded on wing from early July to early September.

The larvae feed on Stellaria holostea and Stellaria uliginosa. Young larvae mine the leaves of their host plant. Older larvae live free among spun leaves. Mining larvae can be found from autumn to May.
