= Caryocolum stramentella =

Scientific classification
- Kingdom: Animalia
- Phylum: Arthropoda
- Class: Insecta
- Order: Lepidoptera
- Family: Gelechiidae
- Genus: Caryocolum
- Species: C. stramentella

Binomial name
- Caryocolum stramentella (Rebel, 1935)

Synonyms
- Bryotropha stramentella Rebel, 1935; Gelechia stramentella; Caryocolum emarginatum Huemer, 1988

Species of moth

Caryocolum stramentella is a moth of the family Gelechiidae. It is found in Italy and Turkey, Syria, Jordan and Russia.

The wingspan is about 5 mm. Adults have been recorded on wing in the second half of September in Turkey and in August in Italy.
