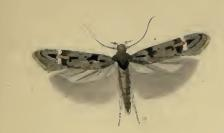

Scientific classification
- Kingdom: Animalia
- Phylum: Arthropoda
- Clade: Pancrustacea
- Class: Insecta
- Order: Lepidoptera
- Family: Gelechiidae
- Genus: Caryocolum
- Species: C. proxima

Binomial name
- Caryocolum proxima (Haworth, 1828)

Synonyms
- Recurvaria proxima Haworth, 1828; Caryocolum proximum; Gelechia maculiferella Douglas, 1851; Gnorimoschema maculiferella; Gelechia horticolla Peyerimhoff, 1871

= Caryocolum proxima =

Species of moth

Caryocolum proxima is a moth of the family Gelechiidae. It is found in most of Europe. It is also known from North America.

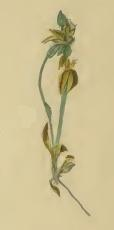
A sprig of Cerastium semidecandrum with a shoot spun together

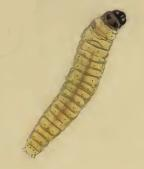
Larva

The wingspan is 9–11.5 mm. They are on wing in August.

The larvae feed on Cerastium fontanum and Stellaria media. They mine the leaves of their host plant. Larvae can be found from April to May.
