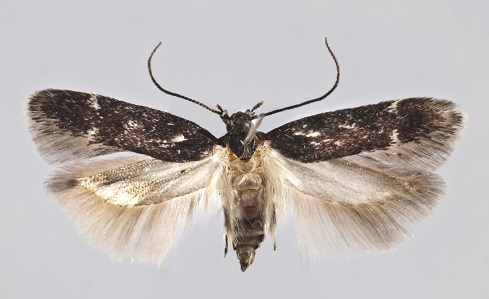

Scientific classification
- Domain: Eukaryota
- Kingdom: Animalia
- Phylum: Arthropoda
- Class: Insecta
- Order: Lepidoptera
- Family: Gelechiidae
- Genus: Caryocolum
- Species: C. amaurella

Binomial name
- Caryocolum amaurella (Hering, 1924)

Synonyms
- Lita amaurella Hering, 1924; Phthorimaea amaurella; Gnorimoschema amaurellum; Lita viscariae Schutze, 1926; Phthorimaea viscariae

= Caryocolum amaurella =

Species of moth

Caryocolum amaurella is a moth of the family Gelechiidae. It is found in Denmark, Fennoscandia, Germany, Austria, Switzerland, Italy, Estonia, Latvia, the Czech Republic, Slovakia, former Yugoslavia, Hungary, Greece, Ukraine and Russia. It is also present in Turkey. The species is restricted to warm and sunny habitats such as dry meadows and pastures from lowland localities to about 2,200 meters in the Alps.

The length of the forewings is 5–6 mm. Adults have been recorded on wing from late June to late September.

The larvae feed on Lychnis viscaria.
