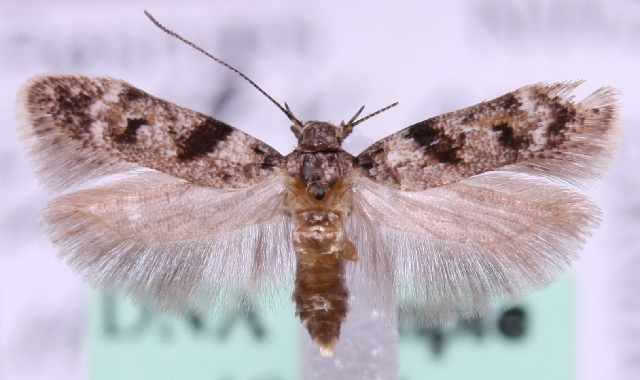

Scientific classification
- Domain: Eukaryota
- Kingdom: Animalia
- Phylum: Arthropoda
- Class: Insecta
- Order: Lepidoptera
- Family: Gelechiidae
- Genus: Caryocolum
- Species: C. blandulella

Binomial name
- Caryocolum blandulella (Tutt, 1887)

Synonyms
- Gelechia (Lita) blandulella Tutt, 1887; Lita blandulella; Phthorimaea blandulella; Gnorimoschema blandulellum; Caryocolum blandulellum

= Caryocolum blandulella =

Species of moth

Caryocolum blandulella is a moth of the family Gelechiidae. It is found in Great Britain, the Netherlands, Spain, France, Germany, Denmark, Finland, Sweden, Switzerland, Italy, Croatia, Hungary, Greece and Ukraine, as well as Corsica. The habitat consists of coastal sand-dunes.

The length of the forewings is 4–5 mm for males and 4–5.5 mm for females. Adults have been recorded on wing from mid-July to late August.

The larvae feed on Cerastium pumilum and possibly Cerastium semidecandrum. They feed on the seed-capsules, living between seeds spun together with silk. Larvae can be found in early June.
