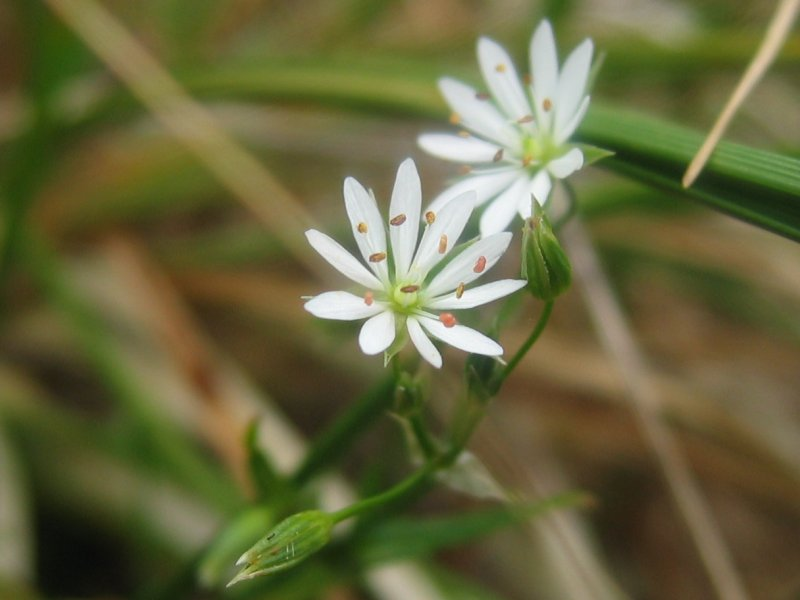

Scientific classification
- Kingdom: Plantae
- Clade: Tracheophytes
- Clade: Angiosperms
- Clade: Eudicots
- Order: Caryophyllales
- Family: Caryophyllaceae
- Genus: Stellaria
- Species: S. graminea

Binomial name
- Stellaria graminea L.

Synonyms
- Alsine graminea (L.) Britton; Stellaria graminea subsp. arvensis Ehrh.; Stellularia graminea (L.) Kuntze

= Stellaria graminea =

Species of flowering plant in the carnation family

Stellaria graminea is a species of flowering plant in the family Caryophyllaceae known by the common names common starwort, grass-leaved stitchwort, lesser stitchwort and grass-like starwort.

== Description ==
Stellaria graminea is a rhizomatous perennial herb producing branching stems which are prostrate, sprawling, trailing, or erect, and reach up to about 90 centimetres (35 in) long. The stems are four-angled, weak, and hairless. It is lined with pairs of linear or lance-shaped leaves, each 1–4 centimetres (0.4–1.6 in) long. The leaves are smooth-edged and hairless except for some hairs lining the bases. The inflorescence bears several flowers, each on a short pedicel. The flower has five pointed green sepals each a few millimeters long which are usually lined with hairs. There are five white petals, each so deeply lobed it appears to be two. The seeds are reddish brown in colour and are 1 millimetre (0.04 in) in diameter. It bears 10 stamens.

== Distribution ==
It is native to Eurasia and widespread in other parts of the temperate world as an introduced species and a common weed.

== Habitat ==
It grows in many types of habitat, including lawns and roadsides.
