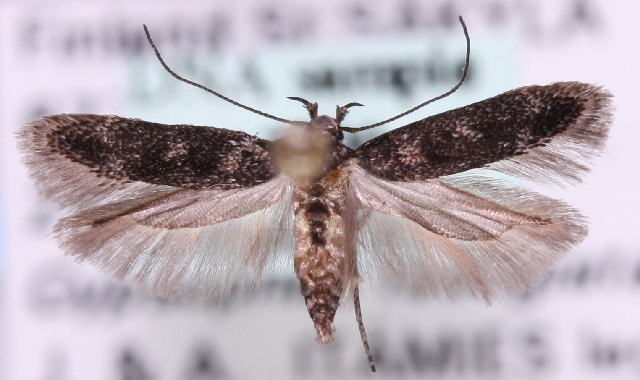

Scientific classification
- Domain: Eukaryota
- Kingdom: Animalia
- Phylum: Arthropoda
- Class: Insecta
- Order: Lepidoptera
- Family: Gelechiidae
- Genus: Caryocolum
- Species: C. petryi

Binomial name
- Caryocolum petryi (Hofmann, 1899)

Synonyms
- Lita petryi Hofmann, 1899; Phthorimaea petryi; Lita (Gelechia) rougemonti Rebel, 1907; Phthorimaea rougemonti; Lita petryi benanderi Hering, 1933; Lita repentella Chretien, 1908; Caryocolum repentella; Phthorimaea repentella; Gnorimoschema repentellum; Caryocolum repentellum

= Caryocolum petryi =

Species of moth

Caryocolum petryi is a moth of the family Gelechiidae. It is found in France, Germany, Austria, Switzerland, Italy, Slovenia, former Yugoslavia, Hungary, Latvia, Lithuania, Sweden and Finland. It is also found in Mongolia and Siberia (Tuva).

The length of the forewings is 4–7 mm for males and 4–6 mm for females. Adults have been recorded on wing from late June to early September.

== Subspecies ==
- Caryocolum petryi petryi
- Caryocolum petryi benanderi (Hering, 1933) (Sweden)
