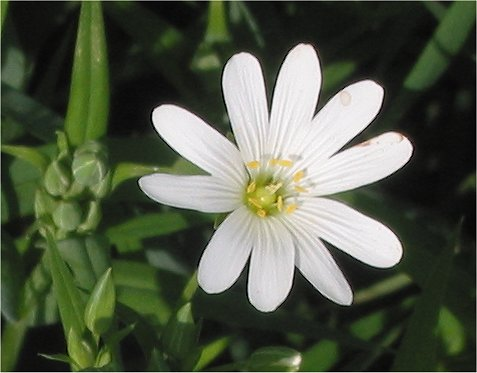
- Distinctive deeply notched petals

Scientific classification
- Kingdom: Plantae
- Clade: Tracheophytes
- Clade: Angiosperms
- Clade: Eudicots
- Order: Caryophyllales
- Family: Caryophyllaceae
- Genus: Rabelera; M.T.Sharples & E.A.Tripp
- Species: R. holostea

Binomial name
- Rabelera holostea (L.) M.T.Sharples & E.A.Tripp

Synonyms
- List: Alsine holostea (L.) Britton; Stellaria holostea L.; Alsine scabra Stokes; Cerastium holosteum Crantz; Stellaria ciliata Bubani; Stellaria connata Dulac; Stellaria glauca Salisb.; Stellaria graminifolia J.G.Gmel. ex Fenzl; Stellaria holostea var. angustifolia Rouy & Foucaud; Stellaria holostea var. apetala (Rostr.) Graebn.; Stellaria holostea f. apetala Rostr.; Stellaria holostea subsp. hispidula A.P.Khokhr.; Stellaria holostea var. micropetala Svanlund; Stellaria holostea var. minor Delastre

= Rabelera holostea =

Species of plant in the carnation family

Rabelera holostea, known as greater stitchwort, greater starwort, and addersmeat, is a perennial herbaceous flowering plant in the family Caryophyllaceae. It was formerly placed in the genus Stellaria, as Stellaria holostea, but was transferred to the genus Rabelera in 2019 based on phylogenetic analyses. It is the only species in the genus Rabelera. Greater stitchwort is native to Western and Central Europe, including the British Isles.

Greater stichwort can be found in woodlands, edges, and open fields and is sometimes grown in gardens.

== Description ==
Greater stitchwort can grow up to 60 cm (24 in) in height, with roughly 4-angled stems. The long, narrow (lanceolate) leaves are greyish green, hairless, sessile, opposite, and decussate (the successive pairs borne at right angles to each other).

The flowers are white, 2–3 cm (0.79–1.18 in) across, with five petals split to about halfway the length of the petal. The sepals are much shorter than the petals.

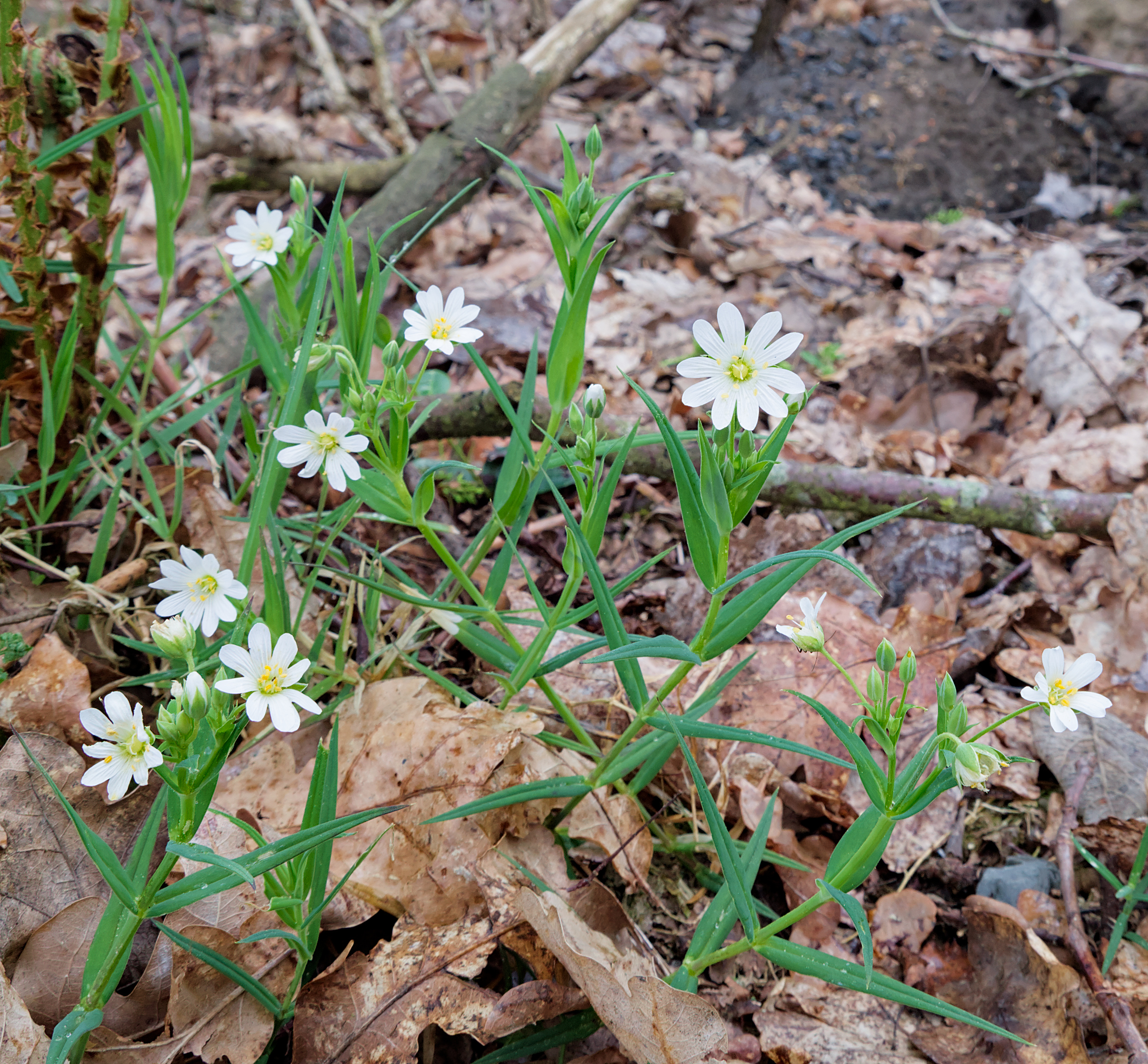
Flowers

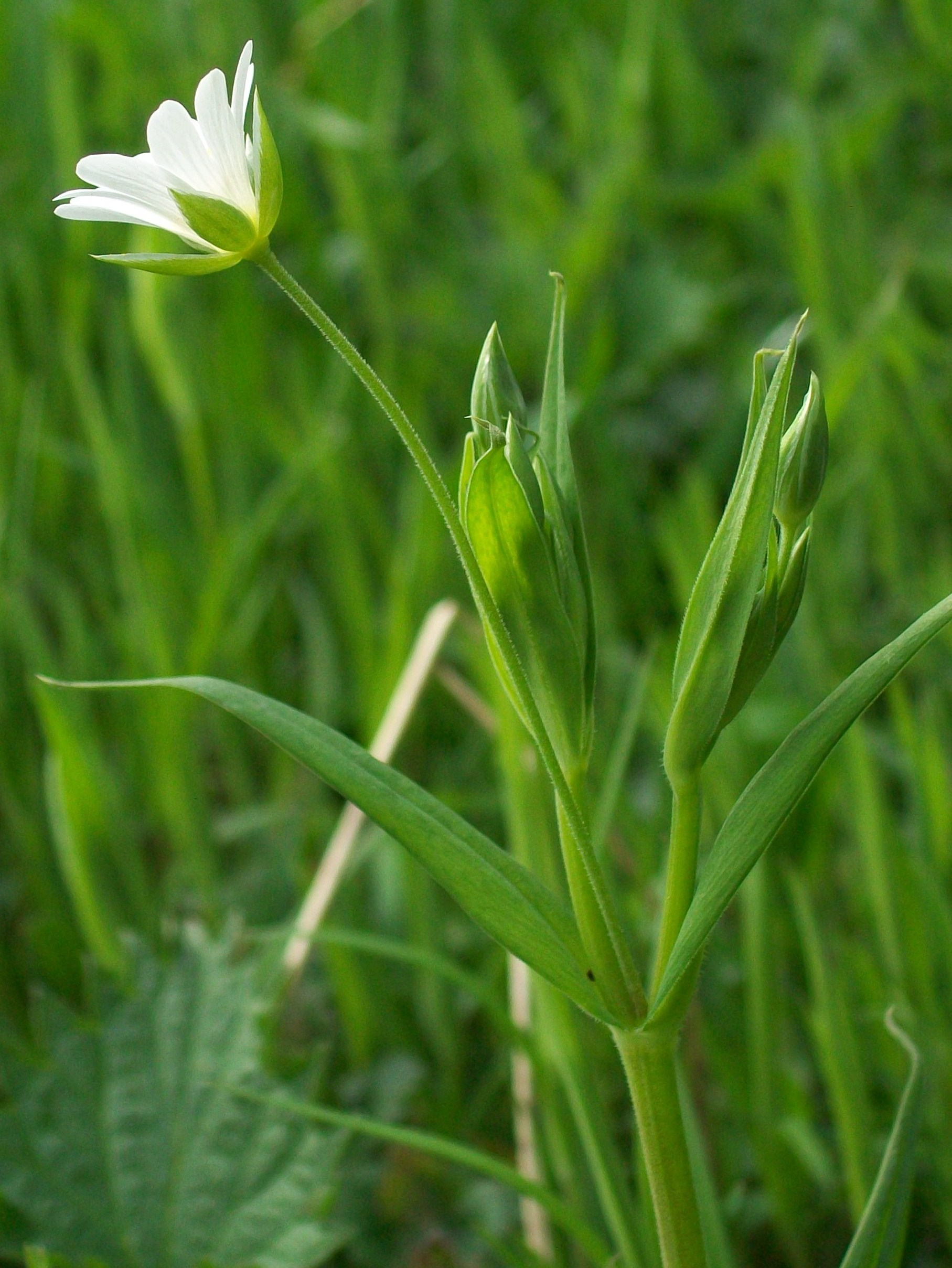
Leaves

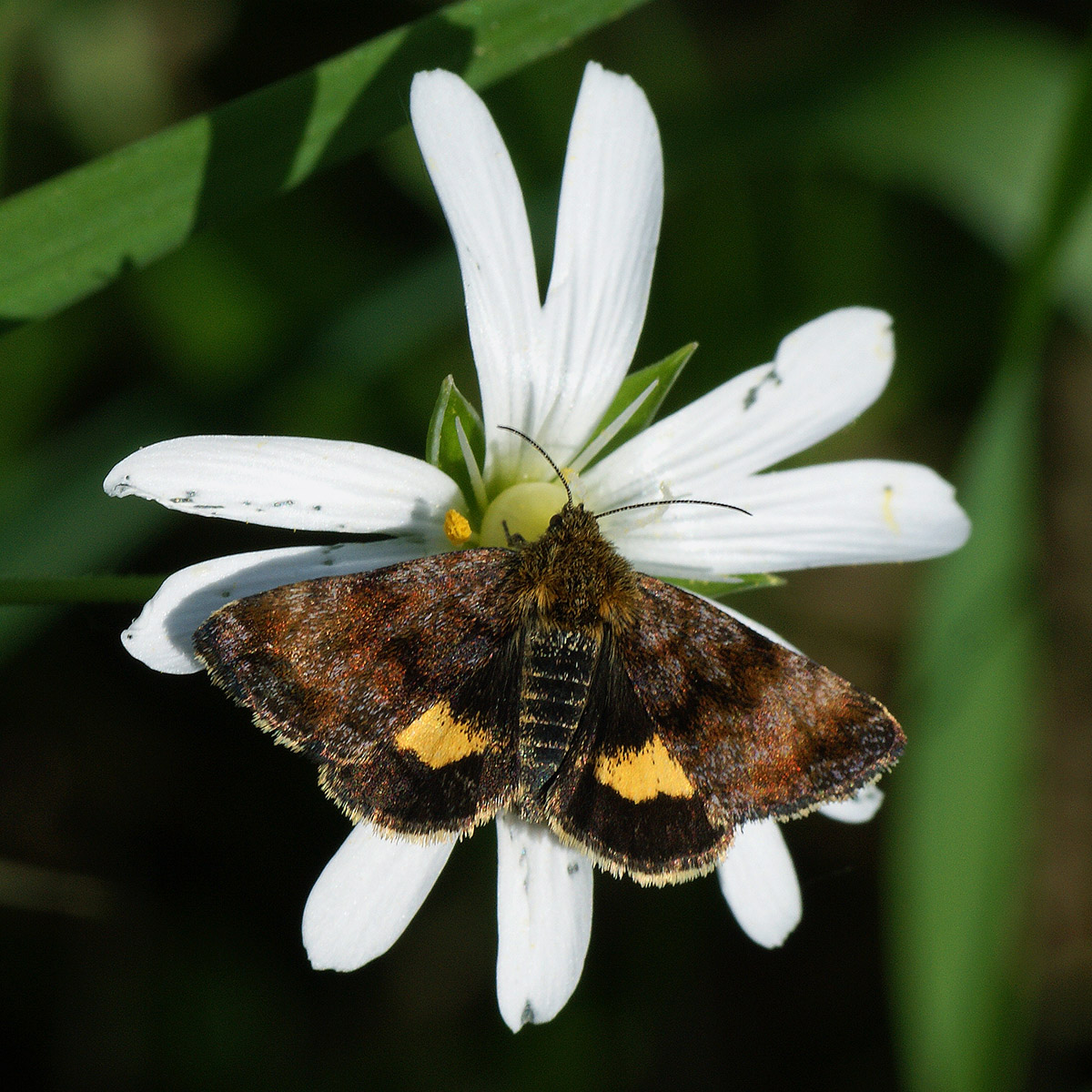
With a small yellow underwing, Panemeria tenebrata

The petals

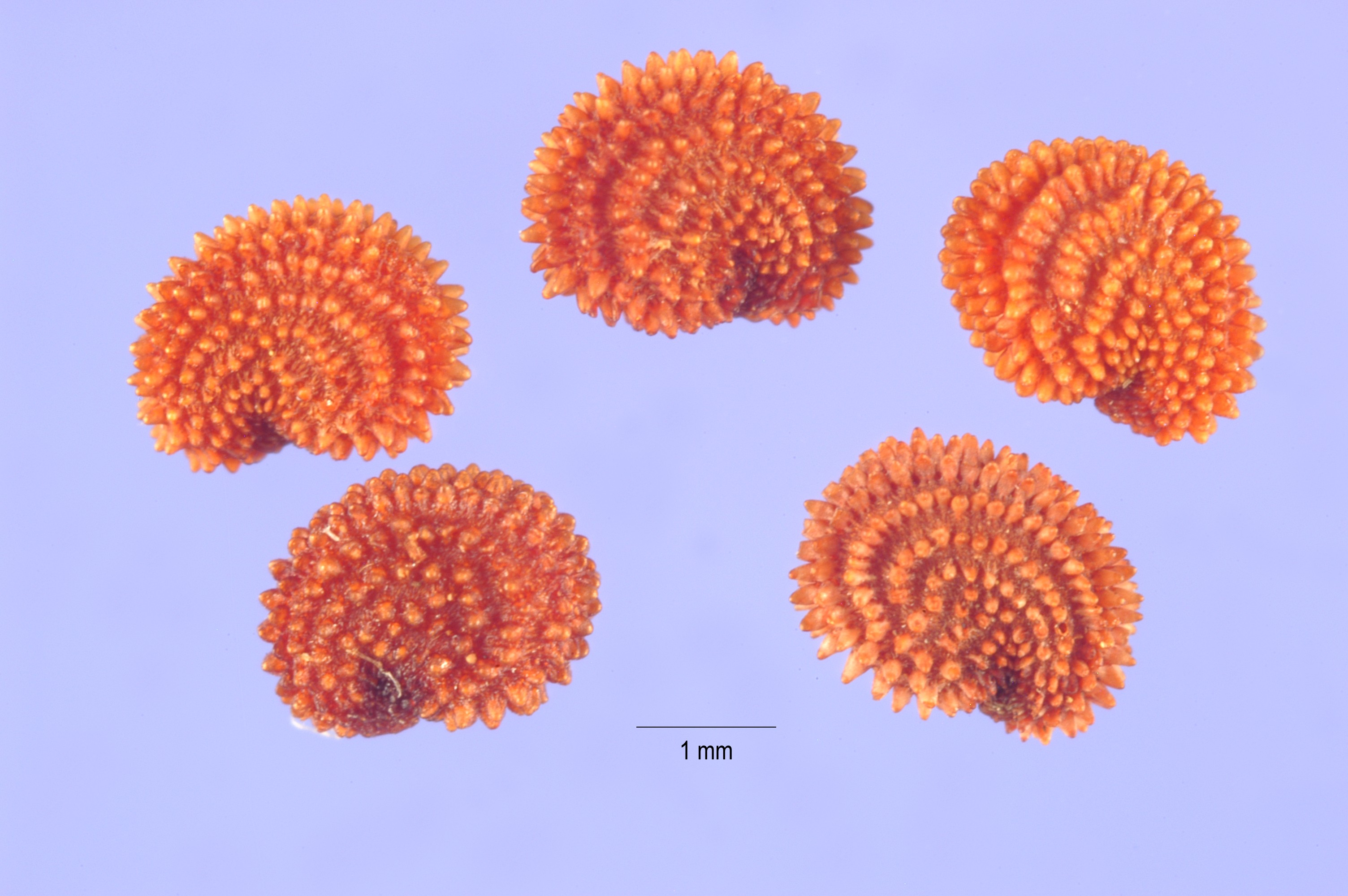
The plant’s seeds

== Taxonomy ==
=== Etymology ===
The specific epithet holostea comes from the Greek holosteon, meaning 'entire bone'; a reference to the brittleness of the weak stems of this plant.

=== Common names ===
The common name stitchwort is a reference to a herbal remedy in which this plant is used allegedly to cure side stitch, which afflicts many people when they try to run without stretching first. Other common names for Rabelera holostea include: daddy's-shirt-buttons, poor-man's buttonhole, brassy buttons, wedding cakes, star-of-Bethlehem, and snapdragon. Many of these names are in reference to the stems, which easily break.
