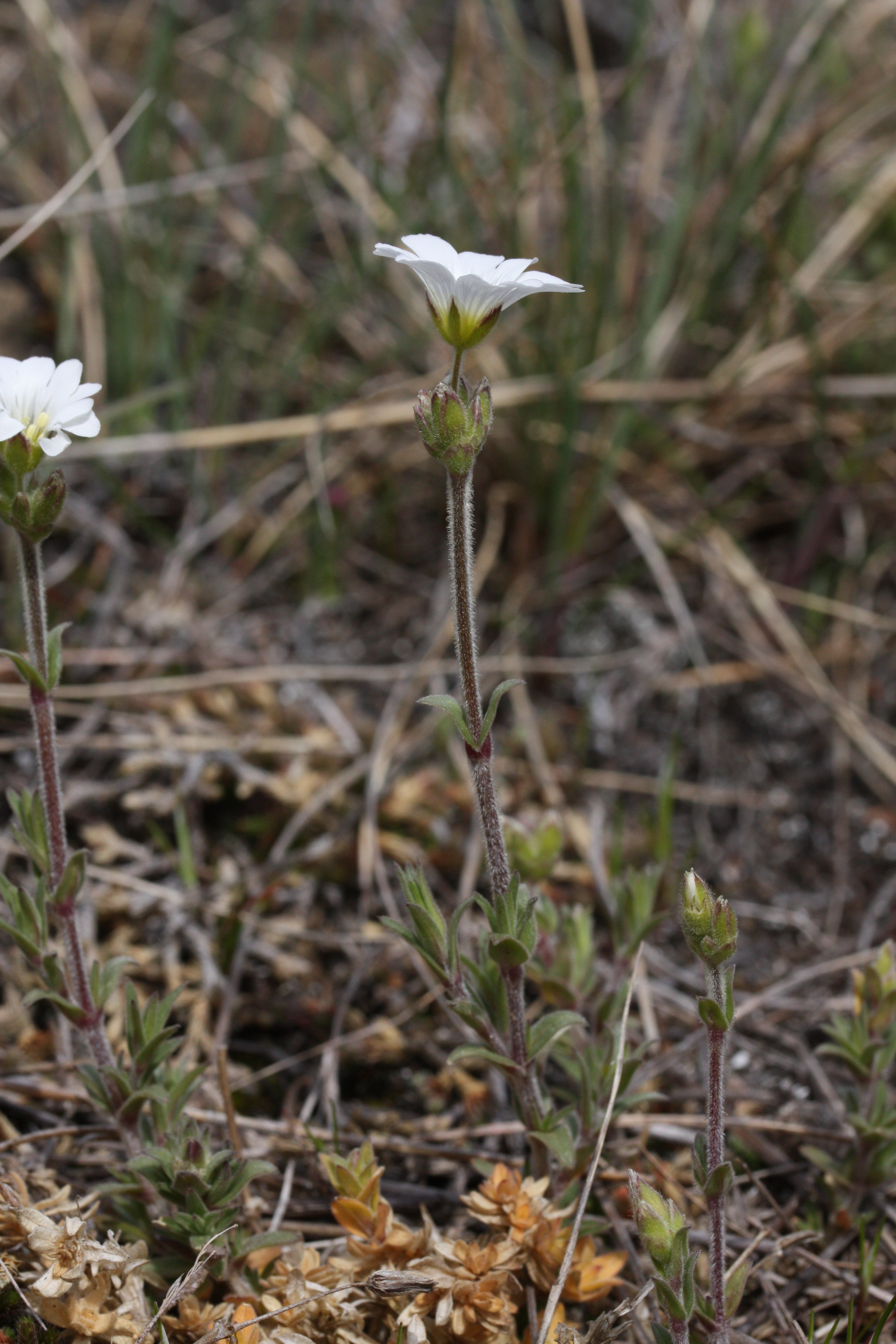

Scientific classification
- Kingdom: Plantae
- Clade: Tracheophytes
- Clade: Angiosperms
- Clade: Eudicots
- Order: Caryophyllales
- Family: Caryophyllaceae
- Genus: Cerastium
- Species: C. arvense

Binomial name
- Cerastium arvense L.

= Cerastium arvense =

Species of flowering plant in the pink family

Cerastium arvense is a species of flowering plant in the pink family known by the common names field mouse-ear and field chickweed. It is a widespread species, occurring throughout Europe and North America, as well as parts of South America. It is a variable species. There are several subspecies, but the number and defining characteristics are disputed.

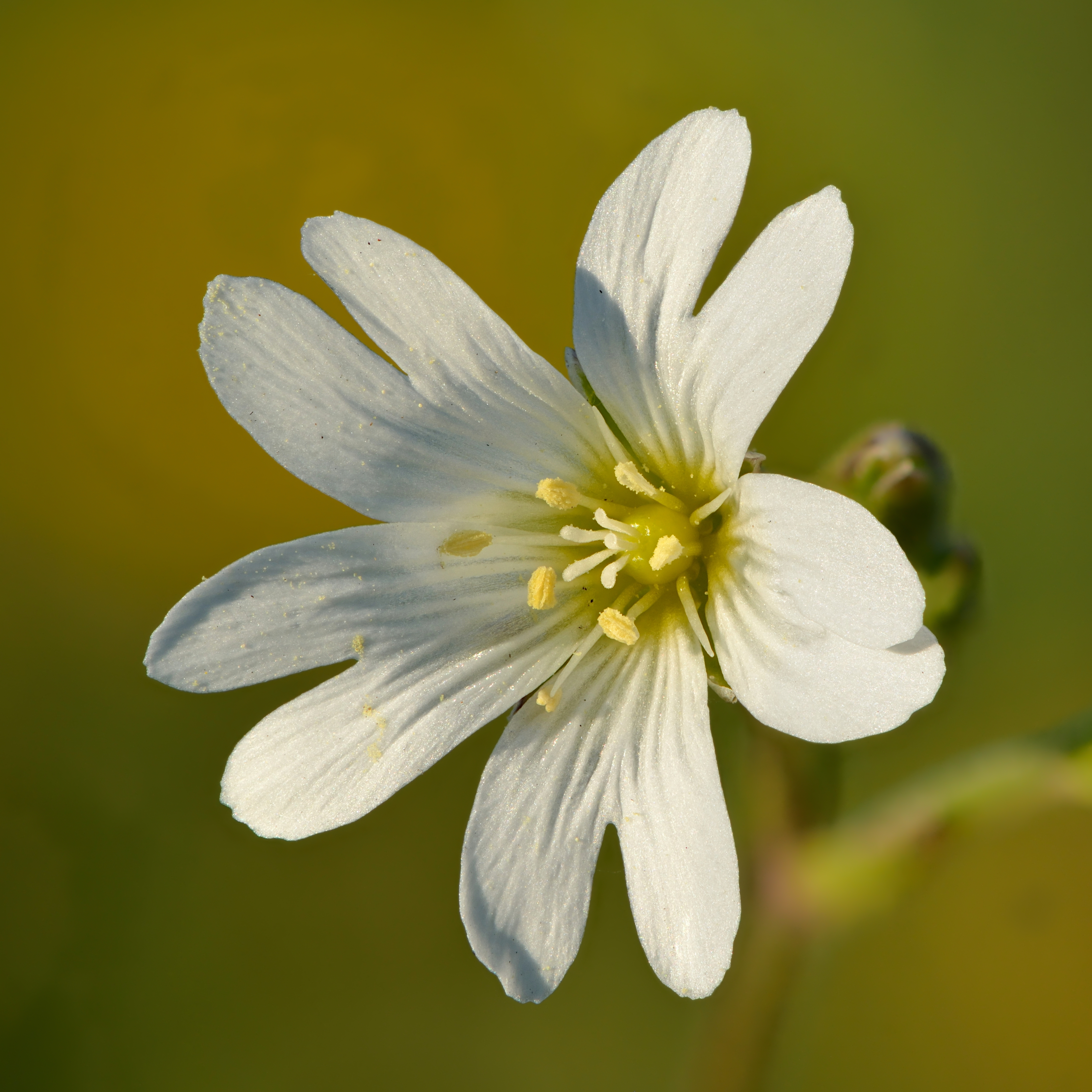
The five white petals are 7.5 to 9 millimetres (0.30 to 0.35 in) long, deeply bilobate with round tips. At the center are ten yellow stamens and five styles.

== Description ==
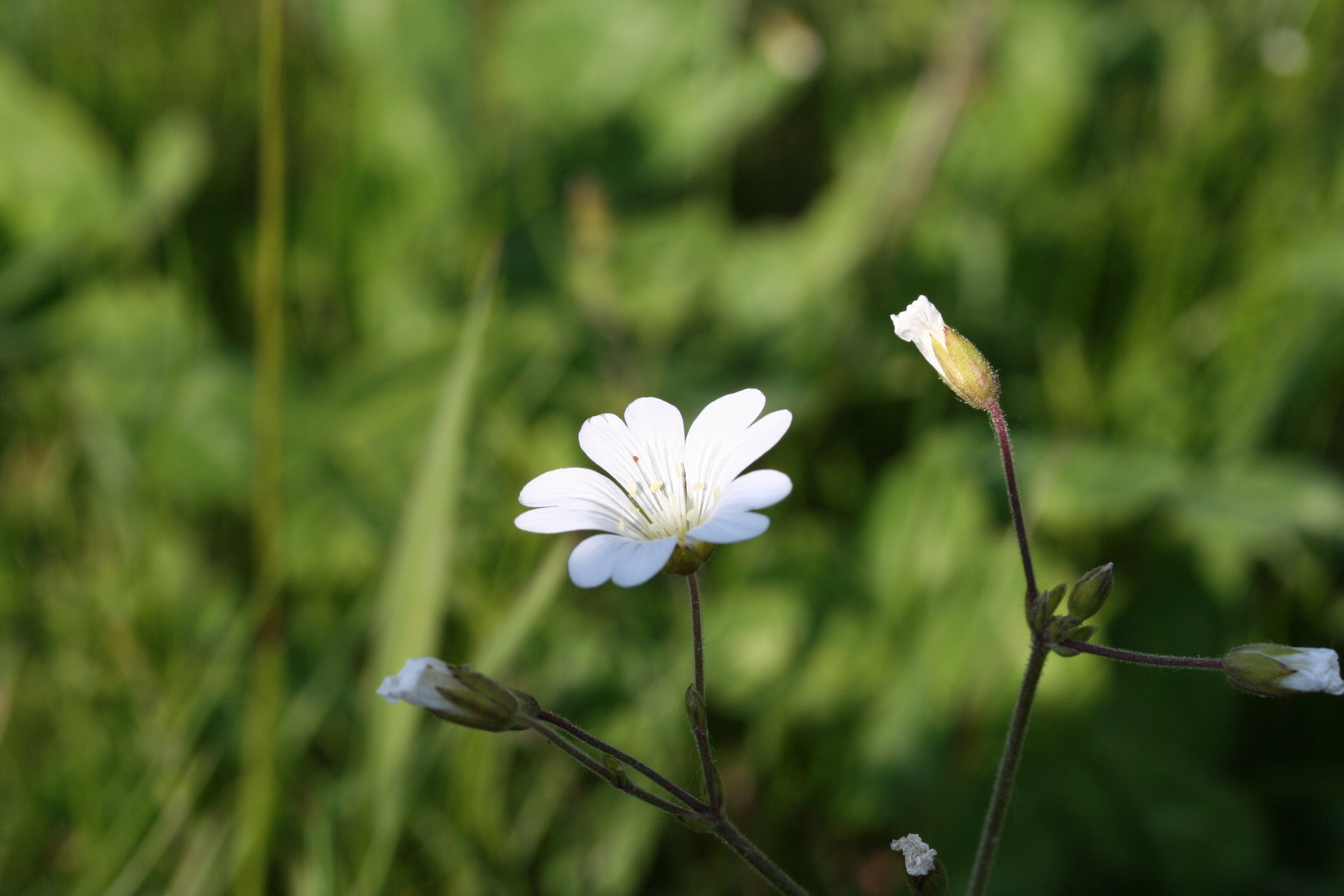
Batiscan River banks Quebec, Canada

Cerastium arvense is a perennial herb growing up to 30–45 cm (12–18 in) tall. It takes the form of a mat, clump, creeper, or upright flower, and may grow from a taproot or tangled system of rhizomes. It is usually somewhat hairy in texture, often with glandular hairs. The leaves are linear, lance-shaped, or oblong, and a few centimeters in length. The inflorescence may consist of a single flower to a dense cluster of many. The flower has five white petals, each with two lobes, and five hairy green sepals at the base. The fruit is a capsule up to 1.5 cm (0.59 in) long with ten tiny teeth at the tip, which contains several brown seeds.

== Cultivation ==
Gardeners interested in wildflowers disagree on if field mouse-ears should be grown in gardens. Noted rock gardener Louise Beebe Wilder recommended against it in the strongest terms. However C.W. Wood and Claude A. Barr both thought that a specimen selected for good qualities had a place in a garden, such as a groundcover in difficult shady spots.
