= Parornix alpicola =

Scientific classification
- Kingdom: Animalia
- Phylum: Arthropoda
- Clade: Pancrustacea
- Class: Insecta
- Order: Lepidoptera
- Family: Gracillariidae
- Genus: Parornix
- Species: P. alpicola

Binomial name
- Parornix alpicola (Wocke, 1877)

Synonyms
- Ornix alpicola Wocke, 1877; Parornix leucostola Pelham-Clinton, 1964

Species of moth

Parornix alpicola is a moth of the family Gracillariidae. It is known from the Alps and Scotland, where it is confined to calcareous coastal hillsides on the north coast, where the only known localities are the Invernaver National Nature Reserve and a spot on the east side of Loch Eriboll.

The wingspan is 8–10 mm. There is one generation per year.

The larvae feed on Dryas octopetala. They mine the leaves of their host plant.

== Taxonomy ==
Some authors consider Parornix alpicola to be a synonym of Parornix scoticella.
