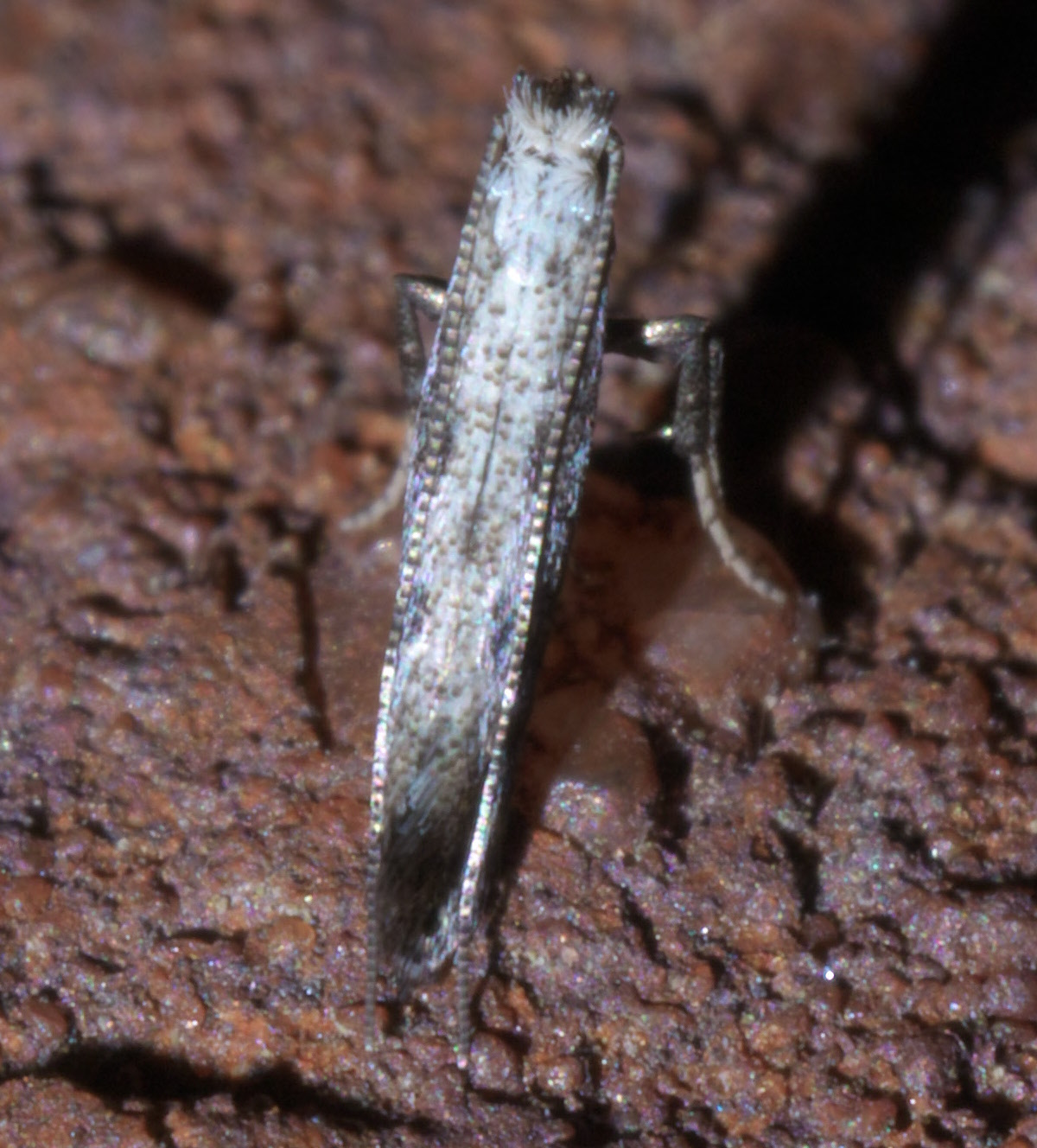

Scientific classification
- Kingdom: Animalia
- Phylum: Arthropoda
- Clade: Pancrustacea
- Class: Insecta
- Order: Lepidoptera
- Family: Gracillariidae
- Subfamily: Parornichinae
- Genus: Parornix; Spuler, 1910

Species
- See text

Synonyms
- Alfaornix Kuznetzov, 1979; Betaornix Kuznetzov, 1979; Deltaornix Kuznetzov, 1979; Gammaornix Kuznetzov, 1979

= Parornix =

Genus of moths

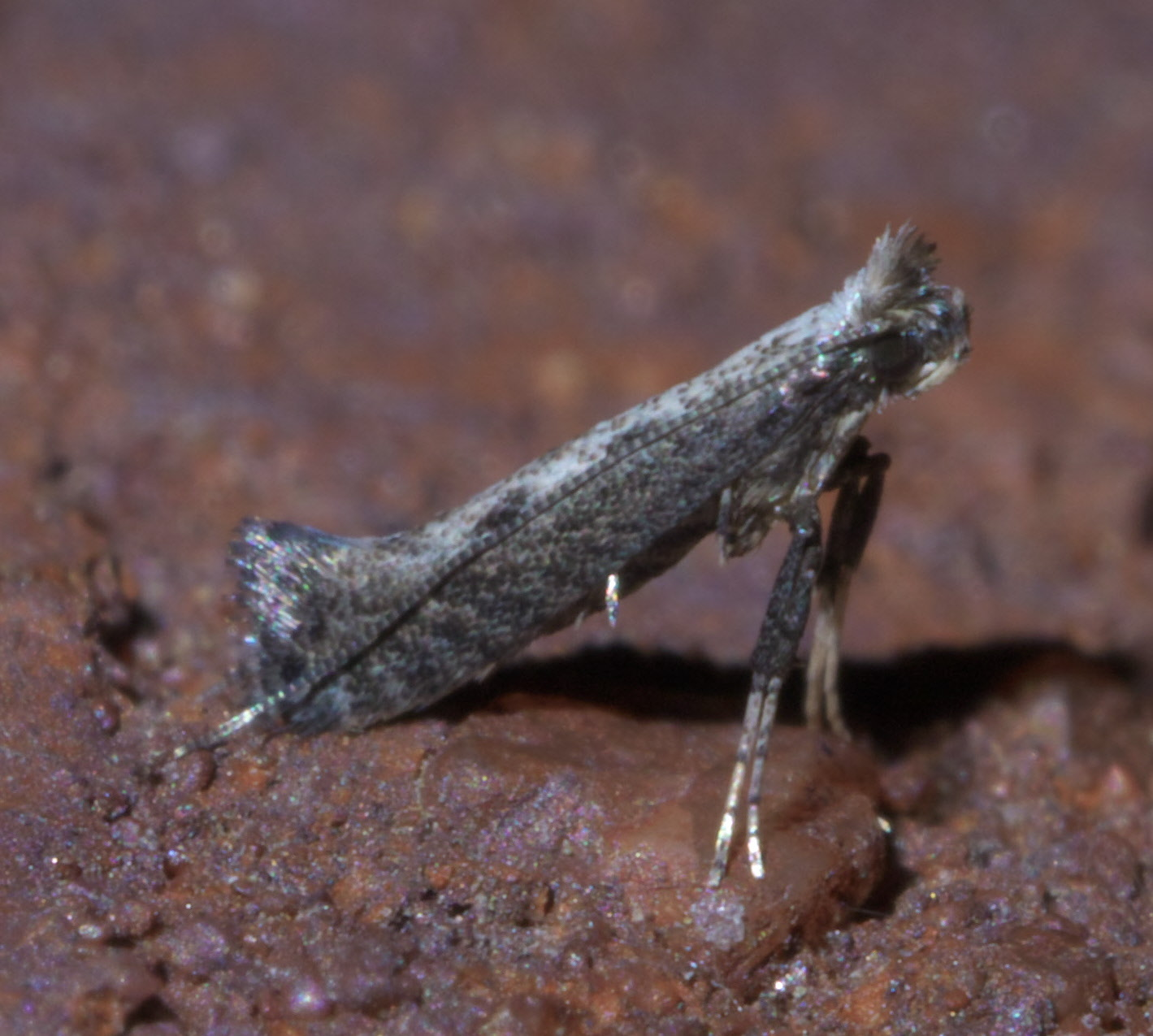
Parornix

Parornix is a genus of moths in the family Gracillariidae. The genus was raised by the German entomologist Arnold Spuler in 1910.

== Species ==
- Parornix acuta Triberti, 1980
- Parornix alni Kumata, 1965
- Parornix alpicola (Wocke, 1877)
- Parornix alta (Braun, 1925)
- Parornix altaica Noreika & Bidzilya, 2006
- Parornix ampliatella (Stainton, 1850)
- Parornix anglicella (Stainton, 1850)
- Parornix anguliferella (Zeller, 1847)
- Parornix arbitrella (Dietz, 1907)
- Parornix arbutifoliella (Dietz, 1907)
- Parornix asiatica Noreika, 1991
- Parornix atripalpella Wahlström, 1979
- Parornix betulae (Stainton, 1854)
- Parornix bifurca Triberti, 1998
- Parornix boreasella (Clemens, 1864)
- Parornix carpinella (Frey, 1863)
- Parornix compressa Triberti, 1990
- Parornix compsumpta Triberti, 1987
- Parornix concussa (Meyrick, 1933)
- Parornix conspicuella (Dietz, 1907)
- Parornix cotoneasterella Kuznetzov, 1978
- Parornix crataegifoliella (Clemens, 1860)
- Parornix devoniella (Stainton, 1850)
- Parornix dubitella (Dietz, 1907)
- Parornix ermolaevi Kuznetzov, 1979
- Parornix errantella (Walsingham, 1897)
- Parornix extrema Kuznetzov & Baryschnikova, 2003
- Parornix fagivora (Frey, 1861)
- Parornix festinella (Clemens, 1860)
- Parornix finitimella (Zeller, 1850)
- Parornix fragilella Triberti, 1981
- Parornix fumidella Kuznetzov, 1979
- Parornix geminatella (Packard, 1869)
- Parornix hastata Triberti, 1990
- Parornix impressipenella (Bilimek, 1867)
- Parornix incerta Triberti, 1982
- Parornix innotata (Walsingham, 1907)
- Parornix inusitatumella (Chambers, 1873)
- Parornix kalmiella (Dietz, 1907)
- Parornix kugitangi Noreika, 1991
- Parornix kumatai Ermolaev, 1993
- Parornix loganella (Stainton, 1848)
- Parornix loricata Triberti, 1998
- Parornix maliphaga Kuznetzov, 1979
- Parornix maura Triberti, 1998
- Parornix melanotella (Dietz, 1907)
- Parornix micrura Walsingham, 1914
- Parornix minor Kumata, 1965
- Parornix mixta (Triberti, 1980)
- Parornix multimaculata (Matsumura, 1931)
- Parornix obliterella (Dietz, 1907)
- Parornix oculata (Triberti, 1979)
- Parornix ornatella Triberti, 1981
- Parornix peregrinaella (Darlington, 1949)
- Parornix persicella Danilevsky, 1955
- Parornix petiolella (Frey, 1863)
- Parornix polygrammella (Wocke, 1862)
- Parornix preciosella (Dietz, 1907)
- Parornix quadripunctella (Clemens, 1861)
- Parornix retrusella Kuznetzov, 1979
- Parornix scoticella (Stainton, 1850)
- Parornix spiraeifoliella (Braun, 1918)
- Parornix strobivorella (Dietz, 1907)
- Parornix subfinitimella Kuznetzov, 1956
- Parornix szocsi (Gozmány, 1952)
- Parornix tenella (Rebel, 1919)
- Parornix texanella (Busck, 1906)
- Parornix torquillella (Zeller, 1850)
- Parornix traugotti Svensson, 1976
- Parornix trepidella (Clemens, 1860)
- Parornix turcmeniella Kuznetzov, 1956
- Parornix vicinella (Dietz, 1907)

== Taxonomy ==
The genus Paronix comes from para, meaning alongside and ornix named after the genus Ornix Treitschke, 1833, which refers to ornis, a bird. The genus Ornix originally included a wide range of feathery-winged microlepidoptera in the Coleophoridae and the Gracillariidae. Ornix was an early synonym of the genus Coleophora as a number of moths were named after birds. The feathery-winged moths were later restricted to Paronix.
