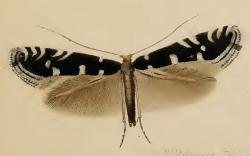

Scientific classification
- Kingdom: Animalia
- Phylum: Arthropoda
- Clade: Pancrustacea
- Class: Insecta
- Order: Lepidoptera
- Family: Gracillariidae
- Genus: Parornix
- Species: P. loganella

Binomial name
- Parornix loganella (Stainton, 1848)

Synonyms
- Argyromiges loganella Stainton, 1848

= Parornix loganella =

Species of moth

Parornix loganella is a moth of the family Gracillariidae. It is found from Fennoscandia and northern Russia to the British Isles, Denmark and the Baltic States.

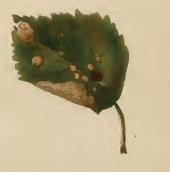
Birch leaf with part of its edge turned down

Larva

== Description ==
The wingspan is 9–11 mm. The head is grey mixed with dark brown. Palpi white. Forewings blackish-fuscous; numerous costal strigulae, a spot in disc posteriorly, and two dorsal spots white; a black apical dot; cilia fuscous, terminal half white except on tornus, with a black subapical line. Hindwings are dark grey. The larva is pale green; dorsal line darker; head brown; segment 2 with four black spots.

== Biology ==
The larvae feed on Betula species. They mine the leaves of their host plant. The mine, larva and pupa cannot be distinguished from those of Parornix betulae.
