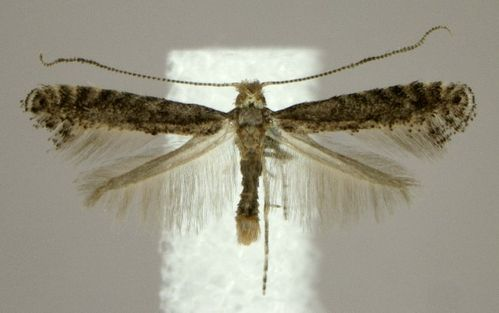

Scientific classification
- Kingdom: Animalia
- Phylum: Arthropoda
- Clade: Pancrustacea
- Class: Insecta
- Order: Lepidoptera
- Family: Gracillariidae
- Genus: Parornix
- Species: P. crataegifoliella

Binomial name
- Parornix crataegifoliella (Clemens, 1860)

= Parornix crataegifoliella =

Species of moth

Parornix crataegifoliella is a moth of the family Gracillariidae. It is known from Canada (Québec and Nova Scotia) the United States (including Maine, Pennsylvania, Vermont, Maryland and Illinois).

The larvae feed on Amelanchier species, Crataegus species (including Crataegus calpodendron, Crataegus parvifolia and Crataegus tomentosa) and Prunus serotina.
