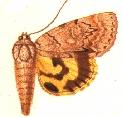

Scientific classification
- Kingdom: Animalia
- Phylum: Arthropoda
- Class: Insecta
- Order: Lepidoptera
- Superfamily: Noctuoidea
- Family: Erebidae
- Genus: Catocala
- Species: C. alabamae

Binomial name
- Catocala alabamae Grote, 1875

Synonyms
- Ephesia alabamae; Catocala olivia H. Edwards, 1880; Catocala titania Dodge, 1900; Catocala distincta

= Catocala alabamae =

Species of moth

Catocala alabamae, the Alabama underwing or titan underwing, is a moth of the family Erebidae. It is found from Pennsylvania south to Florida, west to Texas and north to Missouri, Wisconsin, and Illinois.

The wingspan is 20–40 mm. Adults are on wing from April to August depending on the location. There is probably one generation per year.

The larvae feed on Crataegus, Crataegus calpodendron, Malus coronaria and Prunus angustifolia.

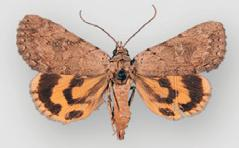

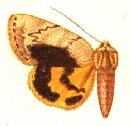
