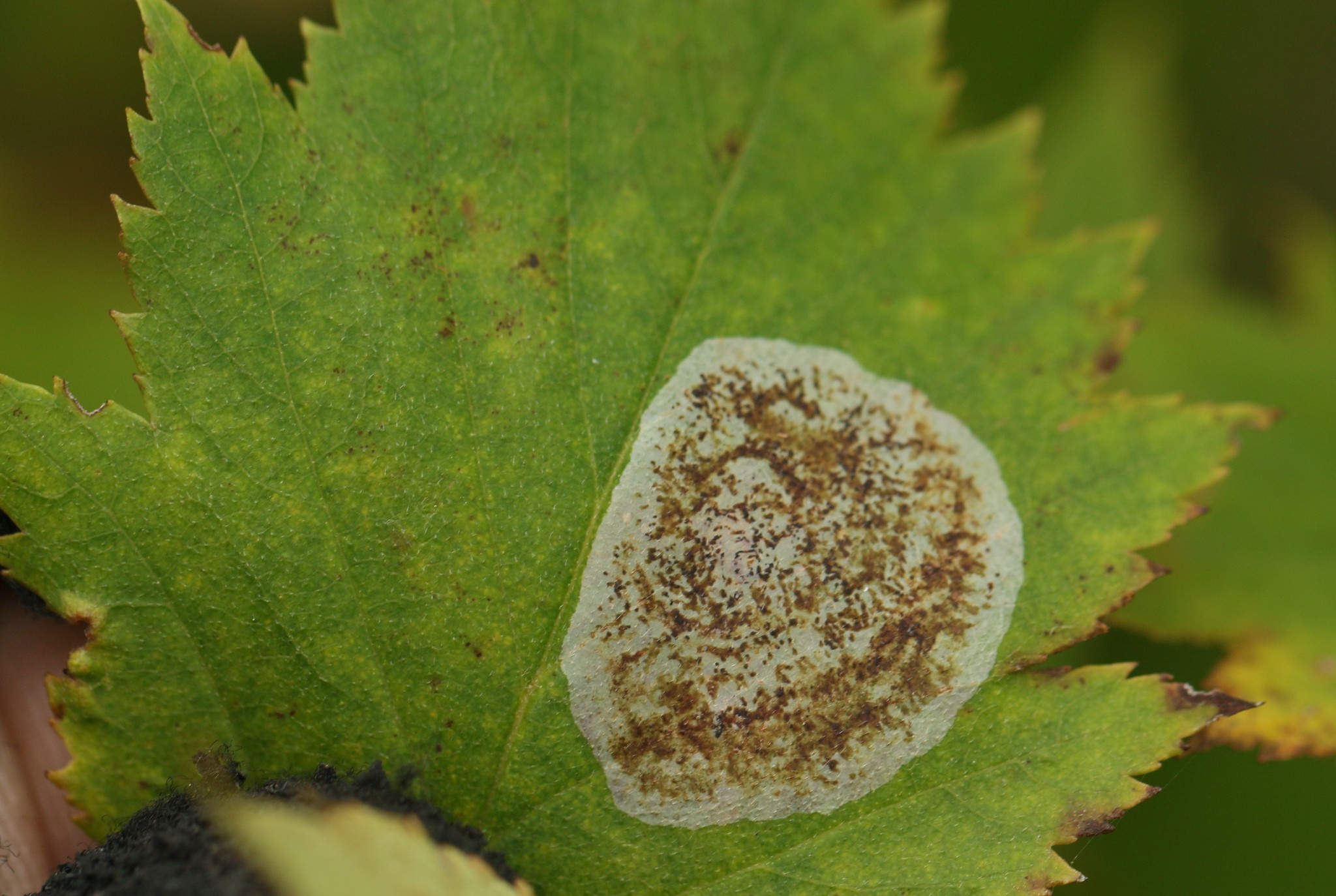
- Leaf mine on Crataegus leaf

Scientific classification
- Kingdom: Animalia
- Phylum: Arthropoda
- Clade: Pancrustacea
- Class: Insecta
- Order: Lepidoptera
- Family: Gracillariidae
- Genus: Parornix
- Species: P. inusitatumella

Binomial name
- Parornix inusitatumella (Chambers, 1873)

Synonyms
- Parornix inusitatella (Meyrick, 1912)

= Parornix inusitatumella =

Species of moth

Parornix inusitatumella is a moth of the family Gracillariidae. It is known from Ontario, Québec, New Brunswick, Nova Scotia, and Prince Edward Island in Canada, and from Illinois, Kentucky, Ohio, Michigan, Massachusetts, and Maine in the United States.

The larvae are leaf miners of Crataegus mollis and Crataegus calpodendron; the mine is a large, white or yellowish-white blotch, speckled throughout with frass.
