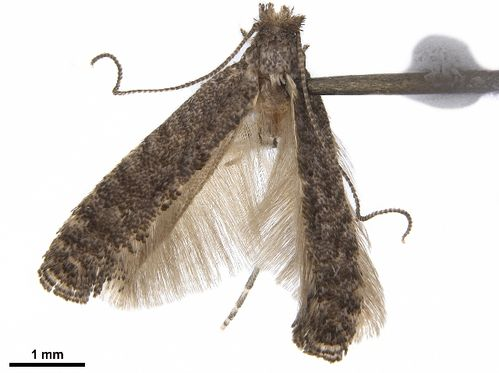

Scientific classification
- Kingdom: Animalia
- Phylum: Arthropoda
- Clade: Pancrustacea
- Class: Insecta
- Order: Lepidoptera
- Family: Gracillariidae
- Genus: Parornix
- Species: P. festinella

Binomial name
- Parornix festinella (Clemens, 1860)

= Parornix festinella =

Species of moth

Parornix festinella is a moth of the family Gracillariidae. It is known from Pennsylvania, United States.
