= Parornix spiraeifoliella =

Scientific classification
- Domain: Eukaryota
- Kingdom: Animalia
- Phylum: Arthropoda
- Class: Insecta
- Order: Lepidoptera
- Family: Gracillariidae
- Genus: Parornix
- Species: P. spiraeifoliella

Binomial name
- Parornix spiraeifoliella (Braun, 1918)

Species of moth

Parornix spiraeifoliella is a moth of the family Gracillariidae. It is known from British Columbia, Canada.

The larvae feed on Spiraea species. They mine the leaves of their host plant. The mine has the form of a much wrinkled mine on the underside of the leaf.
