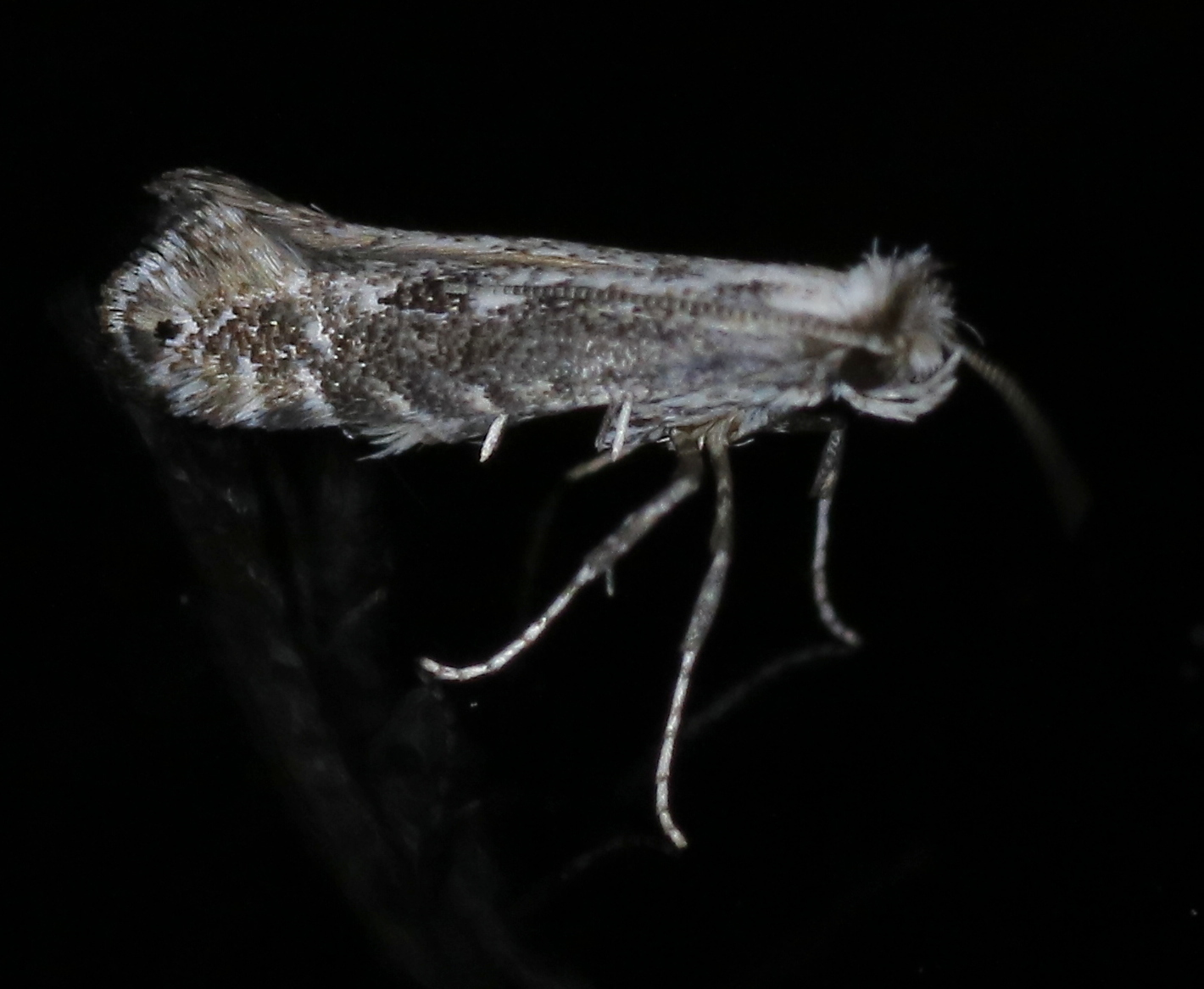

Scientific classification
- Kingdom: Animalia
- Phylum: Arthropoda
- Class: Insecta
- Order: Lepidoptera
- Family: Gracillariidae
- Genus: Parornix
- Species: P. arbutifoliella

Binomial name
- Parornix arbutifoliella (Dietz, 1907)

Synonyms
- Ornix arbutifoliella Dietz, 1907

= Parornix arbutifoliella =

Species of moth

Parornix arbutifoliella is a species of moth in the family Gracillariidae. It is known from the north-eastern United States (Pennsylvania and Maine).

The larvae feed on Photinia pyrifolia. They mine the leaves of their host plant.
