= Parornix errantella =

Scientific classification
- Domain: Eukaryota
- Kingdom: Animalia
- Phylum: Arthropoda
- Class: Insecta
- Order: Lepidoptera
- Family: Gracillariidae
- Genus: Parornix
- Species: P. errantella

Binomial name
- Parornix errantella (Walsingham, 1897)

Species of moth

Parornix errantella is a moth of the family Gracillariidae. It is known from Saint Thomas, U.S. Virgin Islands.
