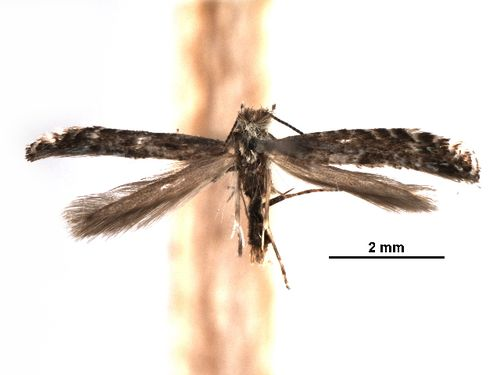

Scientific classification
- Kingdom: Animalia
- Phylum: Arthropoda
- Clade: Pancrustacea
- Class: Insecta
- Order: Lepidoptera
- Family: Gracillariidae
- Genus: Parornix
- Species: P. arbitrella

Binomial name
- Parornix arbitrella (Dietz, 1907)

Synonyms
- Ornix arbitrella Dietz, 1907

= Parornix arbitrella =

Species of moth

Parornix arbitrella is a moth of the family Gracillariidae. It is known from Pennsylvania and Maine in the United States.

The larvae feed on Vaccinium corymbosum. They mine the leaves of their host plant.
