= Parornix polygrammella =

Scientific classification
- Kingdom: Animalia
- Phylum: Arthropoda
- Clade: Pancrustacea
- Class: Insecta
- Order: Lepidoptera
- Family: Gracillariidae
- Genus: Parornix
- Species: P. polygrammella

Binomial name
- Parornix polygrammella (Wocke, 1862)

Synonyms
- Ornix polygrammella Wocke, 1862

Species of moth

Parornix polygrammella is a moth of the family Gracillariidae. It is known from Fennoscandia, Estonia, northern Russia and France.

The larvae feed on Betula nana. They mine the leaves of their host plant.
