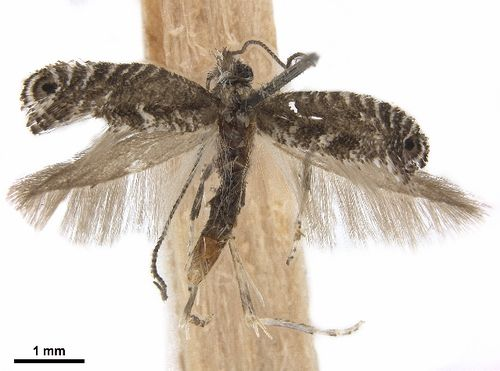

Scientific classification
- Kingdom: Animalia
- Phylum: Arthropoda
- Clade: Pancrustacea
- Class: Insecta
- Order: Lepidoptera
- Family: Gracillariidae
- Genus: Parornix
- Species: P. melanotella

Binomial name
- Parornix melanotella (Dietz, 1907)

Synonyms
- Ornix melanotella Dietz, 1907

= Parornix melanotella =

Species of moth

Parornix melanotella is a moth of the family Gracillariidae. It is known from Canada (Québec) the United States (Pennsylvania, Maine and Vermont).

The larvae feed on Crataegus species. They mine the leaves of their host plant.
