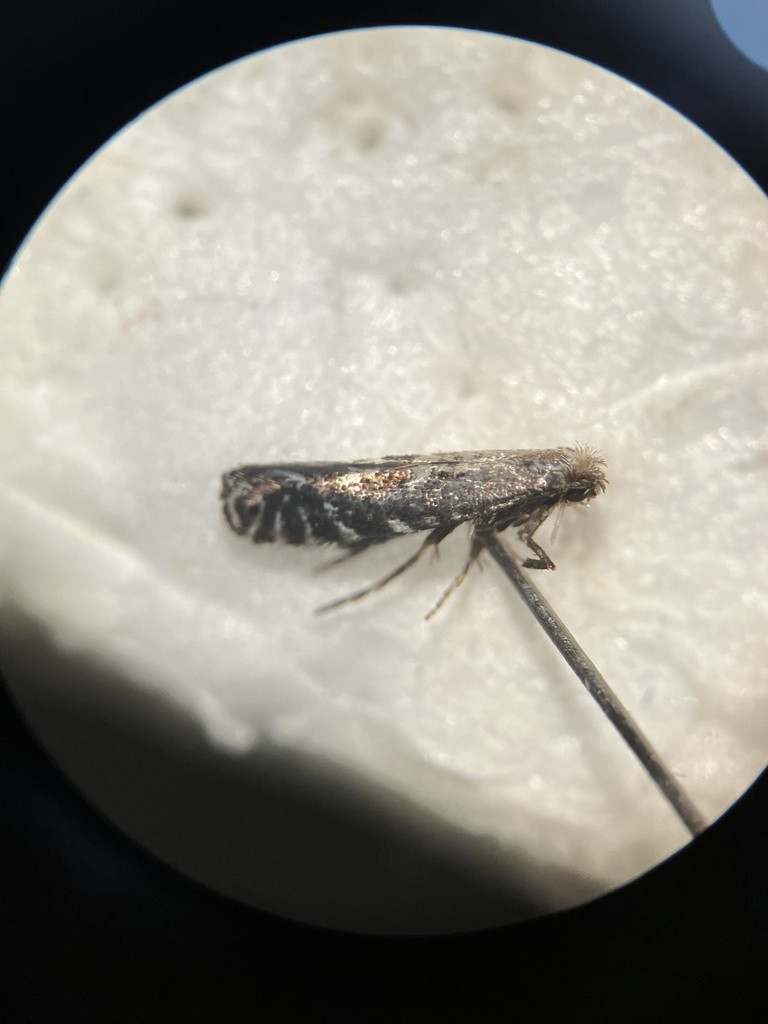

Scientific classification
- Kingdom: Animalia
- Phylum: Arthropoda
- Clade: Pancrustacea
- Class: Insecta
- Order: Lepidoptera
- Family: Gracillariidae
- Genus: Parornix
- Species: P. obliterella

Binomial name
- Parornix obliterella (Dietz, 1907)

Synonyms
- Ornix obliterella Dietz, 1907

= Parornix obliterella =

Species of moth

Parornix obliterella is a moth of the family Gracillariidae. It is known from Pennsylvania, Kentucky, Maine and Vermont in the United States.

The larvae feed on Betula lenta and Betula nigra. They mine the leaves of their host plant.
