= Parornix traugotti =

Scientific classification
- Domain: Eukaryota
- Kingdom: Animalia
- Phylum: Arthropoda
- Class: Insecta
- Order: Lepidoptera
- Family: Gracillariidae
- Genus: Parornix
- Species: P. traugotti

Binomial name
- Parornix traugotti Svensson, 1976

Species of moth

Parornix traugotti is a moth of the family Gracillariidae. It is known from Denmark, the Baltic States, Poland, the Central Asian part of Russia and Sweden.

The wingspan is 9–11 mm.

The larvae feed on Betula pubescens. They mine the leaves of their host plant.
