= Parornix compressa =

Scientific classification
- Kingdom: Animalia
- Phylum: Arthropoda
- Clade: Pancrustacea
- Class: Insecta
- Order: Lepidoptera
- Family: Gracillariidae
- Genus: Parornix
- Species: P. compressa

Binomial name
- Parornix compressa Triberti, 1990

Species of moth

Parornix compressa is a moth of the family Gracillariidae. It is known from Afghanistan and Pakistan.
