= Parornix atripalpella =

Scientific classification
- Domain: Eukaryota
- Kingdom: Animalia
- Phylum: Arthropoda
- Class: Insecta
- Order: Lepidoptera
- Family: Gracillariidae
- Genus: Parornix
- Species: P. atripalpella

Binomial name
- Parornix atripalpella Wahlström, 1979

Species of moth

Parornix atripalpella is a moth of the family Gracillariidae. It is known from France, Germany, mainland Italy, Sardinia, Poland, Sweden and Switzerland.

The wingspan is 9–10 mm.

The larvae feed on Prunus spinosa. They mine the leaves of their host plant.
