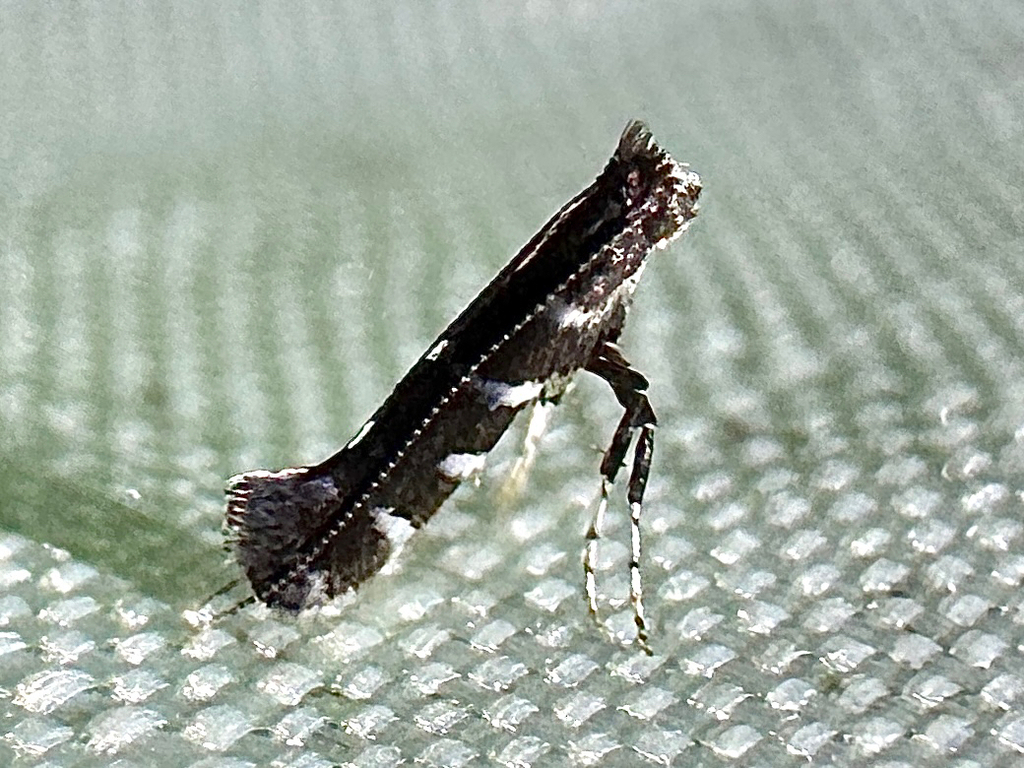

Scientific classification
- Kingdom: Animalia
- Phylum: Arthropoda
- Clade: Pancrustacea
- Class: Insecta
- Order: Lepidoptera
- Family: Gracillariidae
- Genus: Parornix
- Species: P. preciosella

Binomial name
- Parornix preciosella (Dietz, 1907)

Synonyms
- Ornix preciosella Dietz, 1907

= Parornix preciosella =

Species of moth

Parornix preciosella is a moth of the family Gracillariidae. It is known from Québec, Canada, and Connecticut, Pennsylvania and Vermont in the United States.

The larvae feed on Vaccinium corymbosum and Prunus virginiana. They mine the leaves of their host plant.
