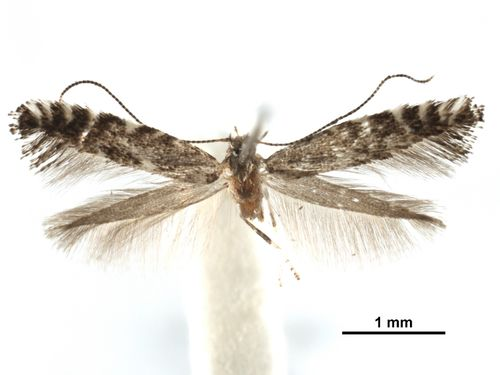

Scientific classification
- Kingdom: Animalia
- Phylum: Arthropoda
- Clade: Pancrustacea
- Class: Insecta
- Order: Lepidoptera
- Family: Gracillariidae
- Genus: Parornix
- Species: P. alta

Binomial name
- Parornix alta (Braun, 1925)

Synonyms
- Parornix alata (Needham, Frost & Tothill, 1928)

= Parornix alta =

Species of moth

Parornix alta is a moth of the family Gracillariidae. It can be found in the Utah and California, United States.

The larvae feed on Amelanchier alnifolia by mining the leaves of their host plant.
