= Parornix minor =

Scientific classification
- Kingdom: Animalia
- Phylum: Arthropoda
- Clade: Pancrustacea
- Class: Insecta
- Order: Lepidoptera
- Family: Gracillariidae
- Genus: Parornix
- Species: P. minor

Binomial name
- Parornix minor Kumata, 1965

Species of moth

Parornix minor is a moth of the family Gracillariidae. It is known from Honshū, Japan.

The wingspan is about 7 mm.

The larvae feed on Ericaceae species. They probably mine the leaves of their host plant.
