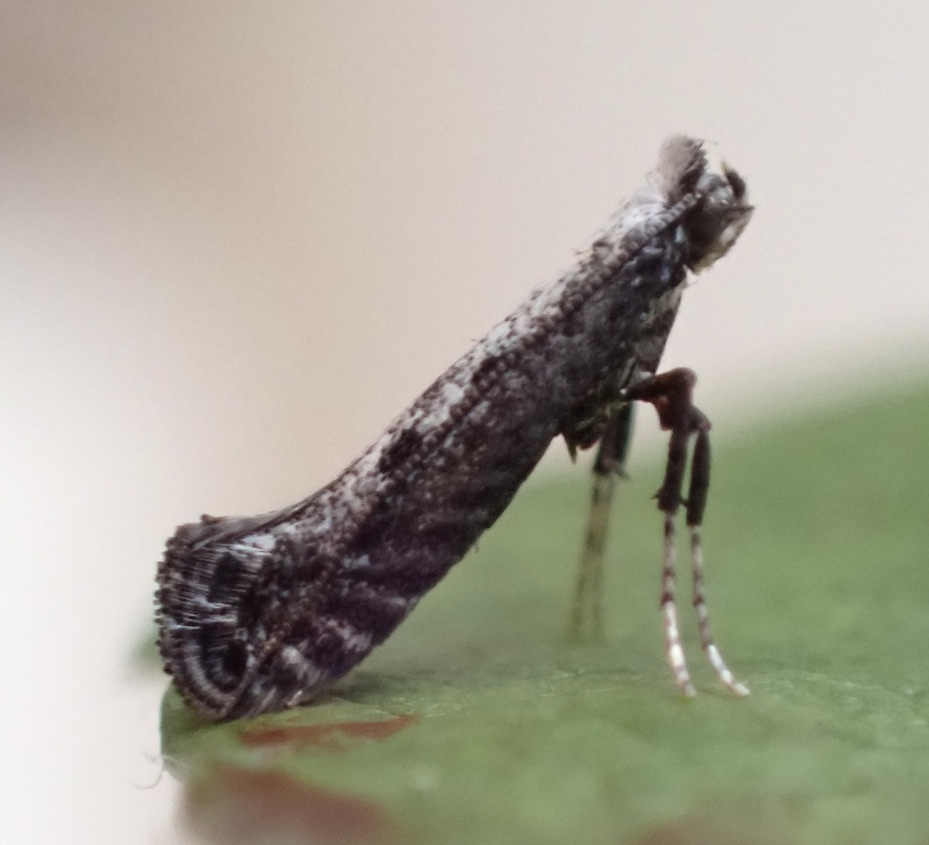

Scientific classification
- Kingdom: Animalia
- Phylum: Arthropoda
- Clade: Pancrustacea
- Class: Insecta
- Order: Lepidoptera
- Family: Gracillariidae
- Genus: Parornix
- Species: P. quadripunctella

Binomial name
- Parornix quadripunctella (Clemens, 1861)

Synonyms
- Ornix albifaciella Dietz, 1907

= Parornix quadripunctella =

Species of moth

Parornix quadripunctella is a moth of the family Gracillariidae. It is known from Québec, Canada, and Georgia, Kansas, Kentucky, Maine, Maryland, Vermont and Pennsylvania in the United States.

The larvae feed on Amelanchier species (including Amelanchier canadensis), Cydonia oblonga, Malus species (including Malus sylvestris), Photinia pyrifolia, Prunus and Pyrus species. They mine the leaves of their host plant.
