= Parornix ampliatella =

Scientific classification
- Kingdom: Animalia
- Phylum: Arthropoda
- Clade: Pancrustacea
- Class: Insecta
- Order: Lepidoptera
- Family: Gracillariidae
- Genus: Parornix
- Species: P. ampliatella

Binomial name
- Parornix ampliatella (Stainton, 1850)

Synonyms
- Ornix ampliatella Stainton, 1850

Species of moth

Parornix ampliatella is a moth of the family Gracillariidae. It is known from Austria, Croatia, Corsica and Italy.
