= Parornix alni =

Scientific classification
- Kingdom: Animalia
- Phylum: Arthropoda
- Class: Insecta
- Order: Lepidoptera
- Family: Gracillariidae
- Genus: Parornix
- Species: P. alni

Binomial name
- Parornix alni Kumata, 1965

Species of moth

Parornix alni is a moth of the family Gracillariidae. It is known from the Japan (Hokkaidō, Honshū) and the Russian Far East.

The wingspan is 8–9 mm.

The larvae feed on Alnus hirsuta. They mine the leaves of their host plant.
