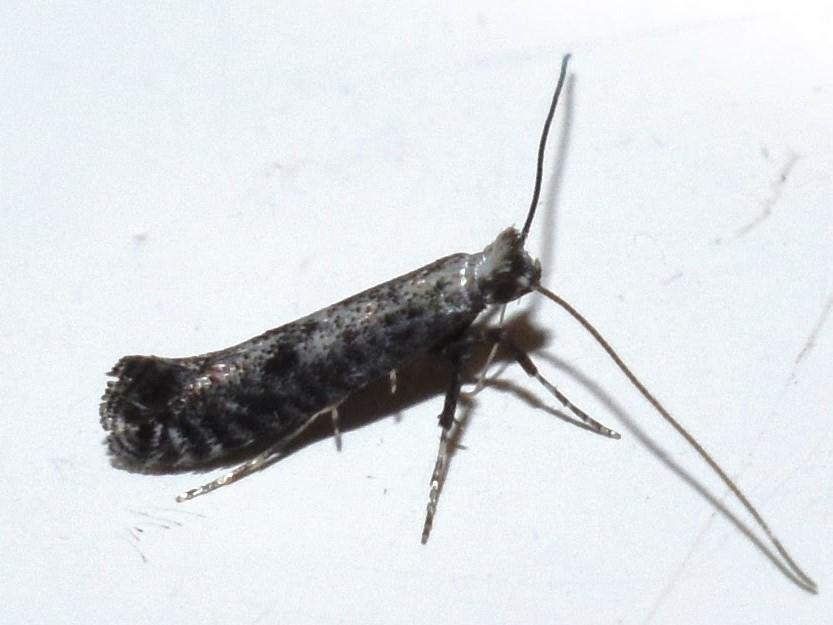

Scientific classification
- Kingdom: Animalia
- Phylum: Arthropoda
- Class: Insecta
- Order: Lepidoptera
- Family: Gracillariidae
- Genus: Parornix
- Species: P. dubitella

Binomial name
- Parornix dubitella (Dietz, 1907)

Synonyms
- Ornix dubitella Dietz, 1907

= Parornix dubitella =

Species of moth

Parornix dubitella is a species of moth in the family Gracillariidae. It is known from eastern North America (United States and Canada).
