= Parornix retrusella =

Scientific classification
- Domain: Eukaryota
- Kingdom: Animalia
- Phylum: Arthropoda
- Class: Insecta
- Order: Lepidoptera
- Family: Gracillariidae
- Genus: Parornix
- Species: P. retrusella

Binomial name
- Parornix retrusella Kuznetzov, 1979

Species of moth

Parornix retrusella is a moth of the family Gracillariidae. It is known from the Russian Far East.

The larvae feed on Crataegus pinnatifida. They probably mine the leaves of their host plant.
