= Parornix bifurca =

Scientific classification
- Kingdom: Animalia
- Phylum: Arthropoda
- Clade: Pancrustacea
- Class: Insecta
- Order: Lepidoptera
- Family: Gracillariidae
- Genus: Parornix
- Species: P. bifurca

Binomial name
- Parornix bifurca Triberti, 1998

Species of moth

Parornix bifurca is a moth of the family Gracillariidae. It is known from Italy.
