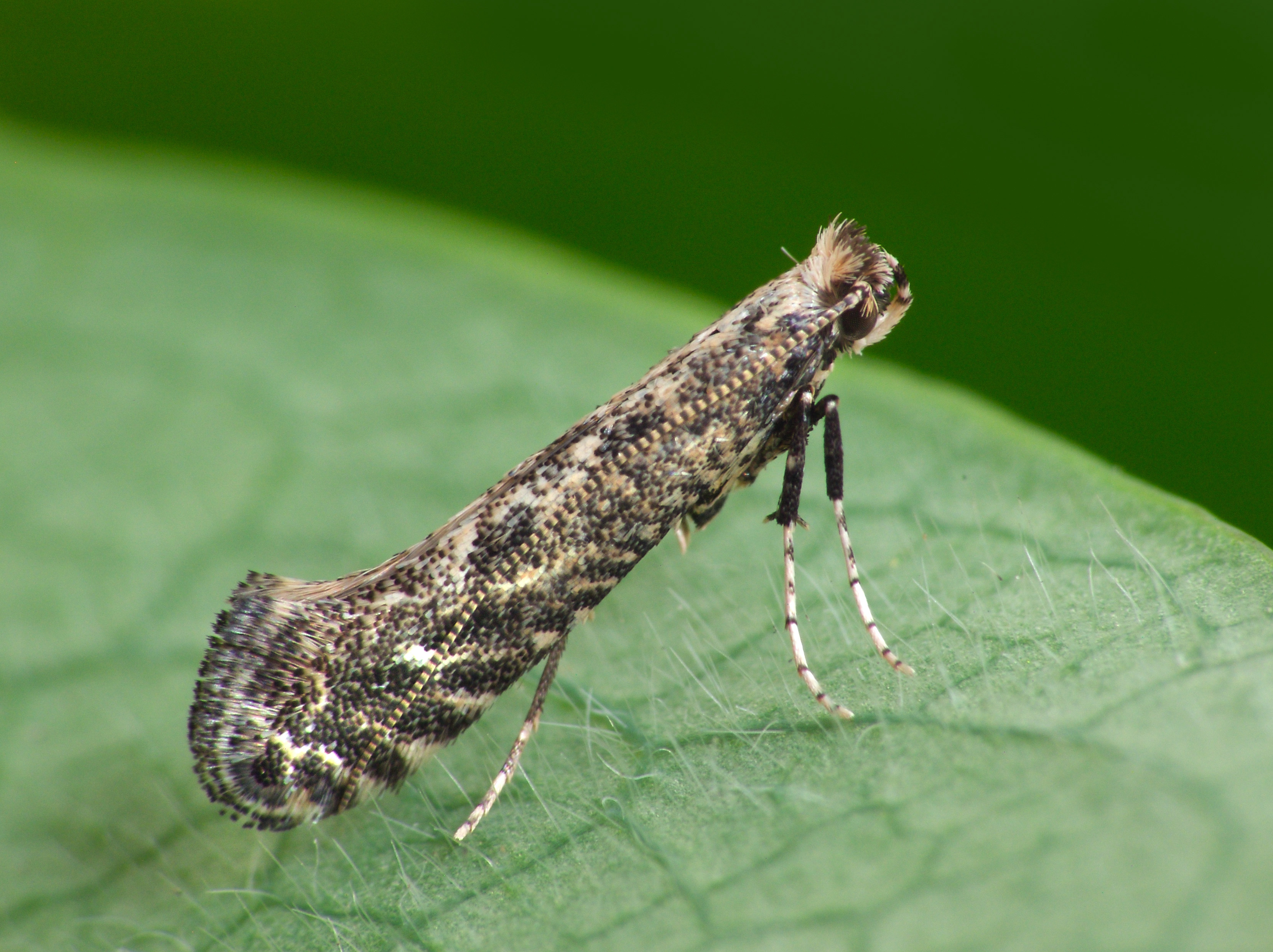
- Ex larva on Hazel
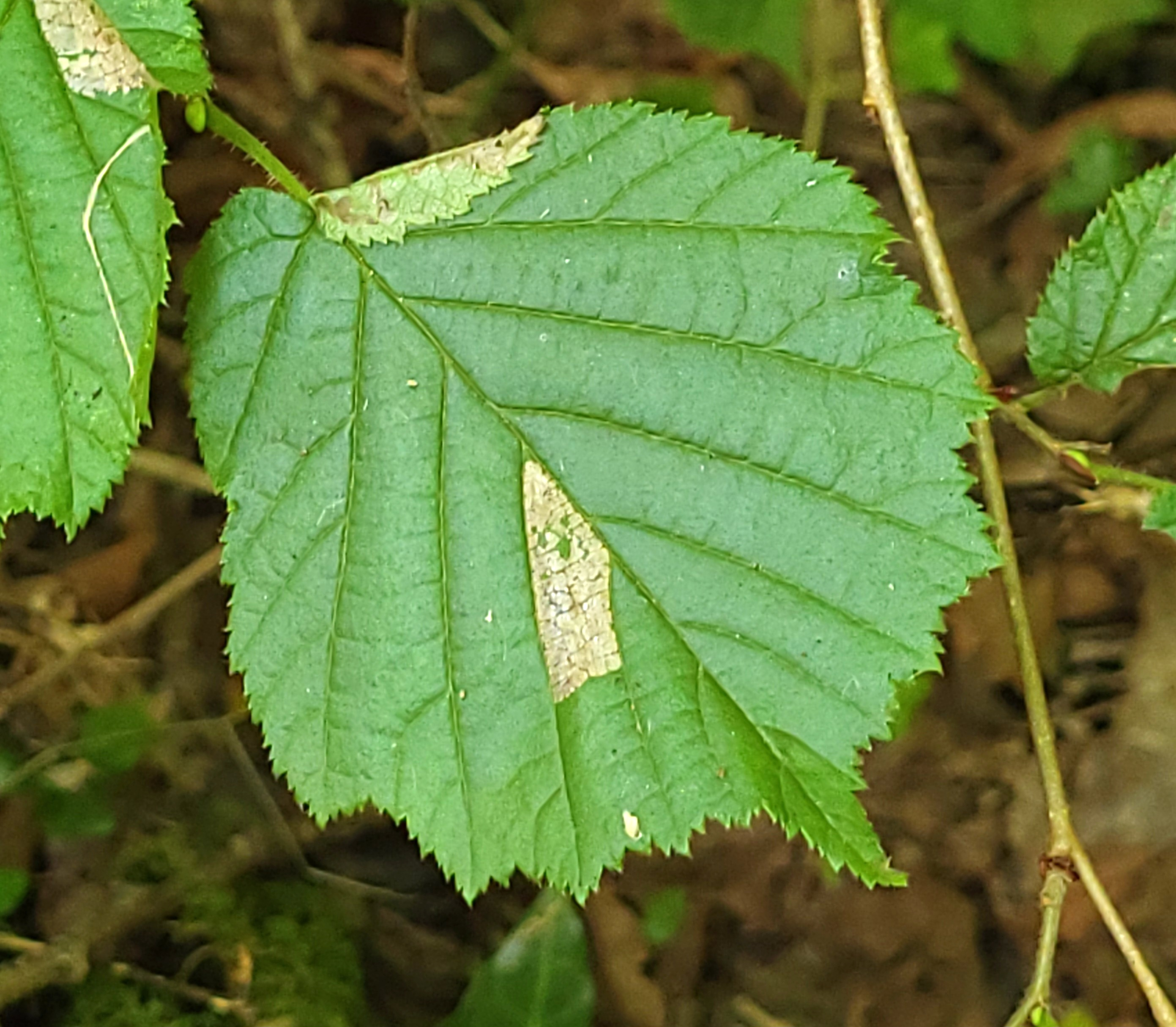
- Mine and leaf fold

Scientific classification
- Domain: Eukaryota
- Kingdom: Animalia
- Phylum: Arthropoda
- Class: Insecta
- Order: Lepidoptera
- Family: Gracillariidae
- Genus: Parornix
- Species: P. devoniella

Binomial name
- Parornix devoniella (Stainton, 1850)

Synonyms
- List: Ornix devoniella Stainton, 1850; Ornix avellanella Stainton, 1854; Ornix cotoneastri Caradja, 1920

= Parornix devoniella =

Species of moth

Parornix devoniella is a moth of the family Gracillariidae found in Europe. The larvae are leaf miners, feeding on the tissue inside the leaves of hazels Corylus species.

== Description ==
The wingspan is 9–10 mm. The head is whitish mixed with fuscous. Palpi white, apex of second joint and median band of terminal dark fuscous. Forewings are grey irrorated with dark fuscous and whitish; numerous costal strigulae, an indistinct posterior spot in disc preceded by a blackish elongate spot, and suffused dorsal strigulae interrupted by two elongate blackish spots whitish; a black apical dot cilia with three entire dark fuscous lines. Hindwings are grey. The larva is whitish-green; dorsal line dark green; head brown; segment 2 with four black spots.

== Biology ==
Adults are on wing in May and again in August in two generations.

The larvae mine the leaves of hazel (Corylus avellana), Turkish hazel (Corylus colurna) and the filbert (Corylus maxima).

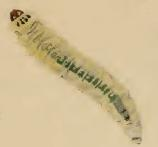
Larva

== Distribution ==
It is known from all of Europe (except the Iberian Peninsula, the Balkan Peninsula and the Mediterranean islands).

== Taxonomy ==
Parornix devoniella was originally named by the English entomologist, Henry Tibbats Stainton in 1850 as Ornix devoniella. The genus Ornix – from ornis, a bird - was raised by the German lepidopterist Georg Friedrich Treitschke in 1833. Ornix originally included a wide range of feathery-winged microlepidoptera, in the Gracillariidae and 489 of the Coleophoridae. Many of the Coleophora were named after birds, and originally placed in the genus Ornix, although no similarity was necessary between the moth and the bird. The Para in Paronix means alongside the genus Ornix. The specific name devoniella is named after the county Devon as the Type species was found in Dawlish in south Devon.
