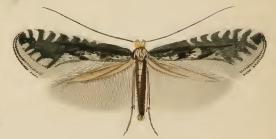

Scientific classification
- Kingdom: Animalia
- Phylum: Arthropoda
- Class: Insecta
- Order: Lepidoptera
- Family: Gracillariidae
- Genus: Parornix
- Species: P. petiolella

Binomial name
- Parornix petiolella (Frey, 1863)

Synonyms
- Ornix petiolella Frey, 1863

= Parornix petiolella =

Species of moth

Parornix petiolella is a moth of the family Gracillariidae. It is known from Austria, Bulgaria, the Czech Republic, France, Germany, Hungary, Italy, Kazakhstan, Luxembourg, Moldova, Poland, Romania, the European part of Russia, Slovakia, Switzerland and Ukraine.

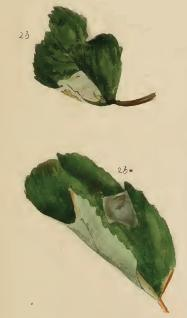
Apple leaf with mine of young larva (2b); another apple leaf with a mine of a young larva, and with its lower parts drawn together by a web spun by the adult larva near the petiole

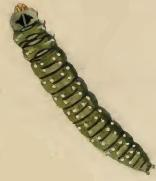
Larva

The larvae feed on Armeniaca, Malus species (including Malus domestica, Malus pumila and Malus sylvestris), Prunus species (including Prunus cerasifera, Prunus cerasus, Prunus domestica, Prunus spinosa and Prunus vulgaris), Persica and Pyrus species.
