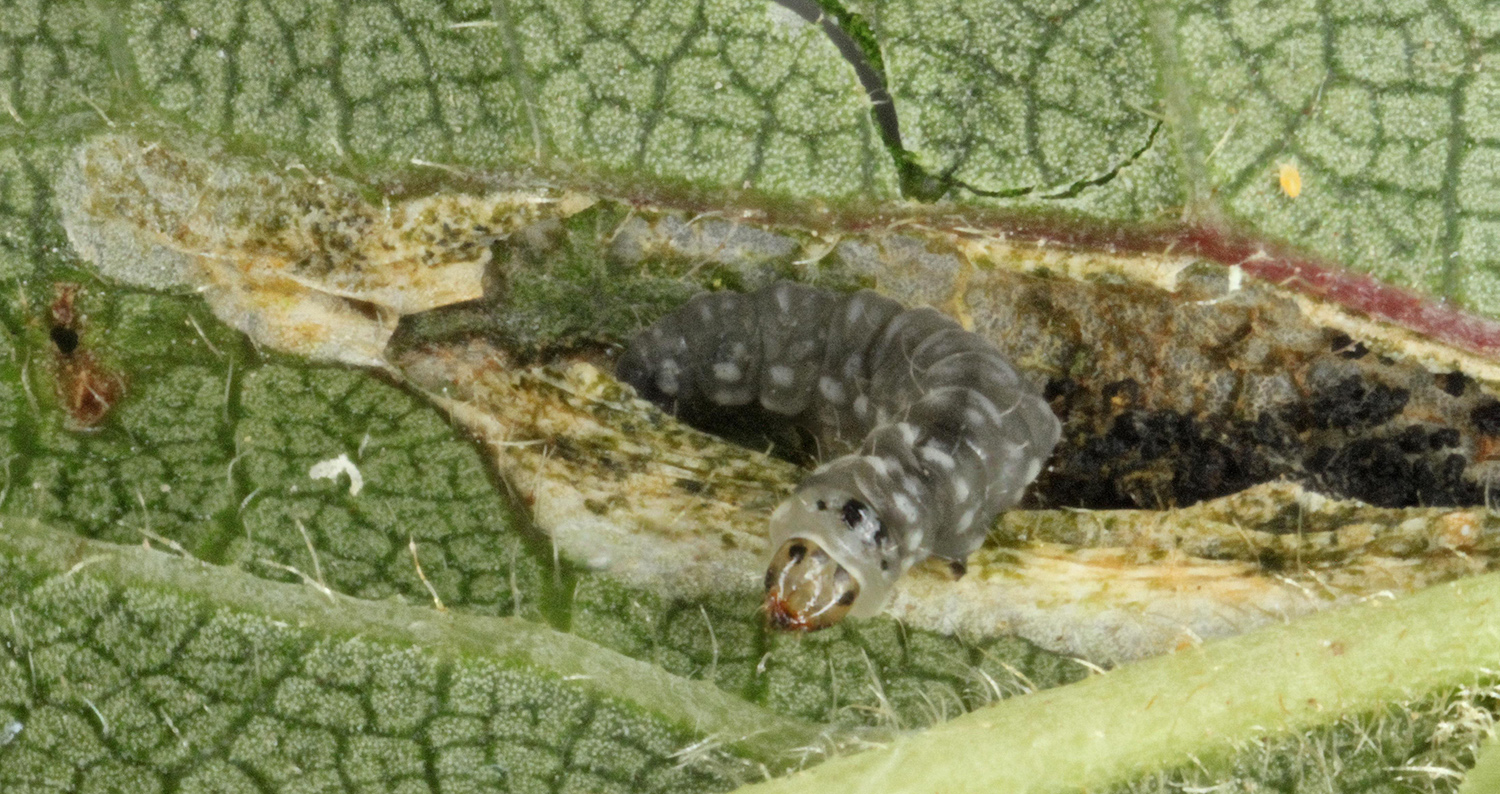

Scientific classification
- Kingdom: Animalia
- Phylum: Arthropoda
- Clade: Pancrustacea
- Class: Insecta
- Order: Lepidoptera
- Family: Gracillariidae
- Genus: Parornix
- Species: P. finitimella

Binomial name
- Parornix finitimella (Zeller, 1850)

Synonyms
- Ornix finitimella Zeller, 1850

= Parornix finitimella =

Species of moth

Parornix finitimella is a moth of the family Gracillariidae. It is found in nearly all of Europe, except Ireland, the Iberian Peninsula and parts of the Balkan Peninsula.

The wingspan is about 10 mm.It is very similar to Parornix torquillella genitalia examination is necessary to identify both.

Adults are on wing in May and again in August in two generations.

The larvae feed on Prunus armeniaca, Prunus avium, Prunus cerasifera, Prunus domestica, Prunus insititia, Prunus mahaleb, Prunus padus, Prunus persica and Prunus spinosa. They mine the leaves of their host plant.
