= Parornix szocsi =

Scientific classification
- Kingdom: Animalia
- Phylum: Arthropoda
- Clade: Pancrustacea
- Class: Insecta
- Order: Lepidoptera
- Family: Gracillariidae
- Genus: Parornix
- Species: P. szocsi

Binomial name
- Parornix szocsi Gozmány, 1952

Synonyms
- Parornix amygdalella Kuznetzov, 1978; Parornix szoecsi

Species of moth

Parornix szocsi is a moth of the family Gracillariidae. It is known from Austria, the Czech Republic, Hungary, Sardinia, Kazakhstan, Romania, the European part of Russia, Slovakia, Spain, Tajikistan and Ukraine.

The larvae feed on Prunus fruticosa and Prunus tenella.
