= Parornix maliphaga =

Scientific classification
- Domain: Eukaryota
- Kingdom: Animalia
- Phylum: Arthropoda
- Class: Insecta
- Order: Lepidoptera
- Family: Gracillariidae
- Genus: Parornix
- Species: P. maliphaga

Binomial name
- Parornix maliphaga Kuznetzov, 1979

Species of moth

Parornix maliphaga is a moth of the family Gracillariidae. It is known from the central Asian part of Russia and the Russian Far East.

The larvae feed on Malus species. They probably mine the leaves of their host plant.
