= Parornix trepidella =

Scientific classification
- Kingdom: Animalia
- Phylum: Arthropoda
- Clade: Pancrustacea
- Class: Insecta
- Order: Lepidoptera
- Family: Gracillariidae
- Genus: Parornix
- Species: P. trepidella

Binomial name
- Parornix trepidella (Clemens, 1860)

Species of moth

Parornix trepidella is a moth of the family Gracillariidae. It is known from the United States (including Pennsylvania).
