= Parornix carpinella =

Scientific classification
- Kingdom: Animalia
- Phylum: Arthropoda
- Class: Insecta
- Order: Lepidoptera
- Family: Gracillariidae
- Genus: Parornix
- Species: P. carpinella

Binomial name
- Parornix carpinella (Frey, 1863)

Synonyms
- Ornix carpinella Frey, 1863; Ornix eppelsheimi Fuchs, 1901

Species of moth

Parornix carpinella is a moth of the family Gracillariidae. It is found from Sweden to the Pyrenees, Italy and Greece and from Great Britain to Russia.

The wingspan is 8–10 mm.

The larvae feed on Acer platanoides, Acer pseudoplatanus, Carpinus betulus, Carpinus orientalis and Ostrya carpinifolia. They mine the leaves of their host plant.
