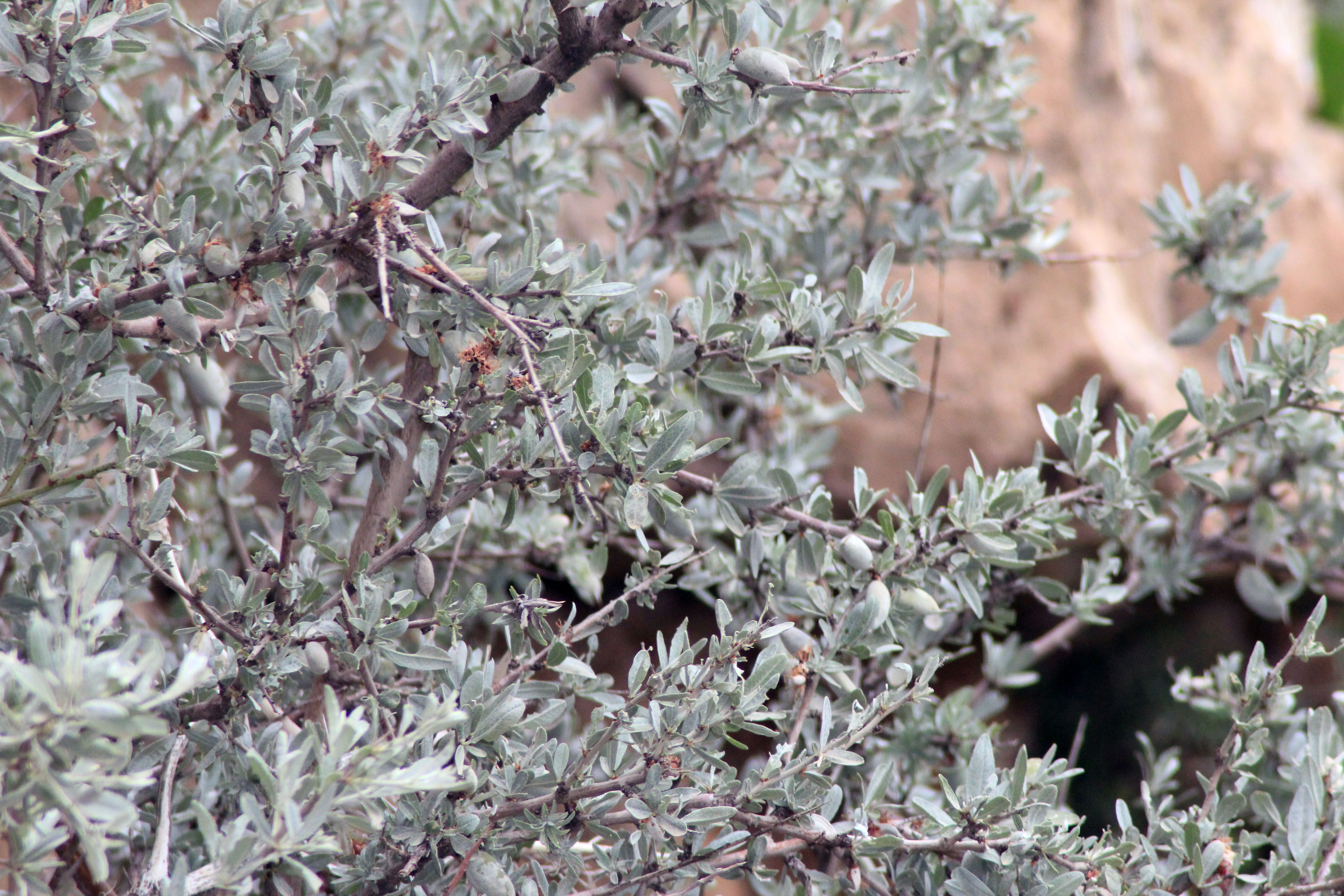
- Prunus scoparia fruit on a tree in the Gilazard valley

Scientific classification
- Kingdom: Plantae
- Clade: Tracheophytes
- Clade: Angiosperms
- Clade: Eudicots
- Clade: Rosids
- Order: Rosales
- Family: Rosaceae
- Genus: Prunus
- Species: P. scoparia

Binomial name
- Prunus scoparia (Spach) C.K.Schneid.

Synonyms
- Amygdalus scoparia Spach

= Prunus scoparia =

Species of plant

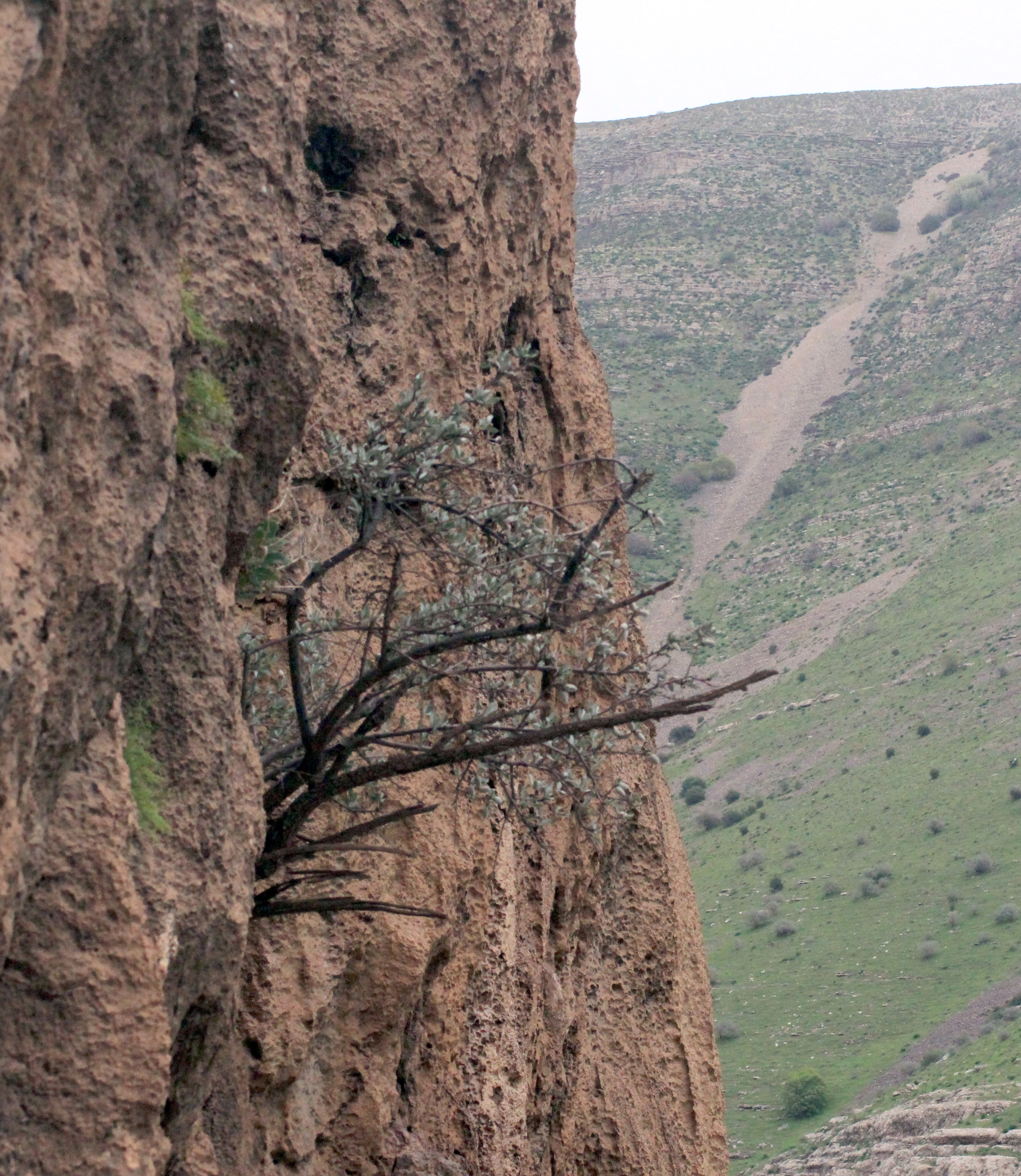
P. scoparia in the Gilazard Valley

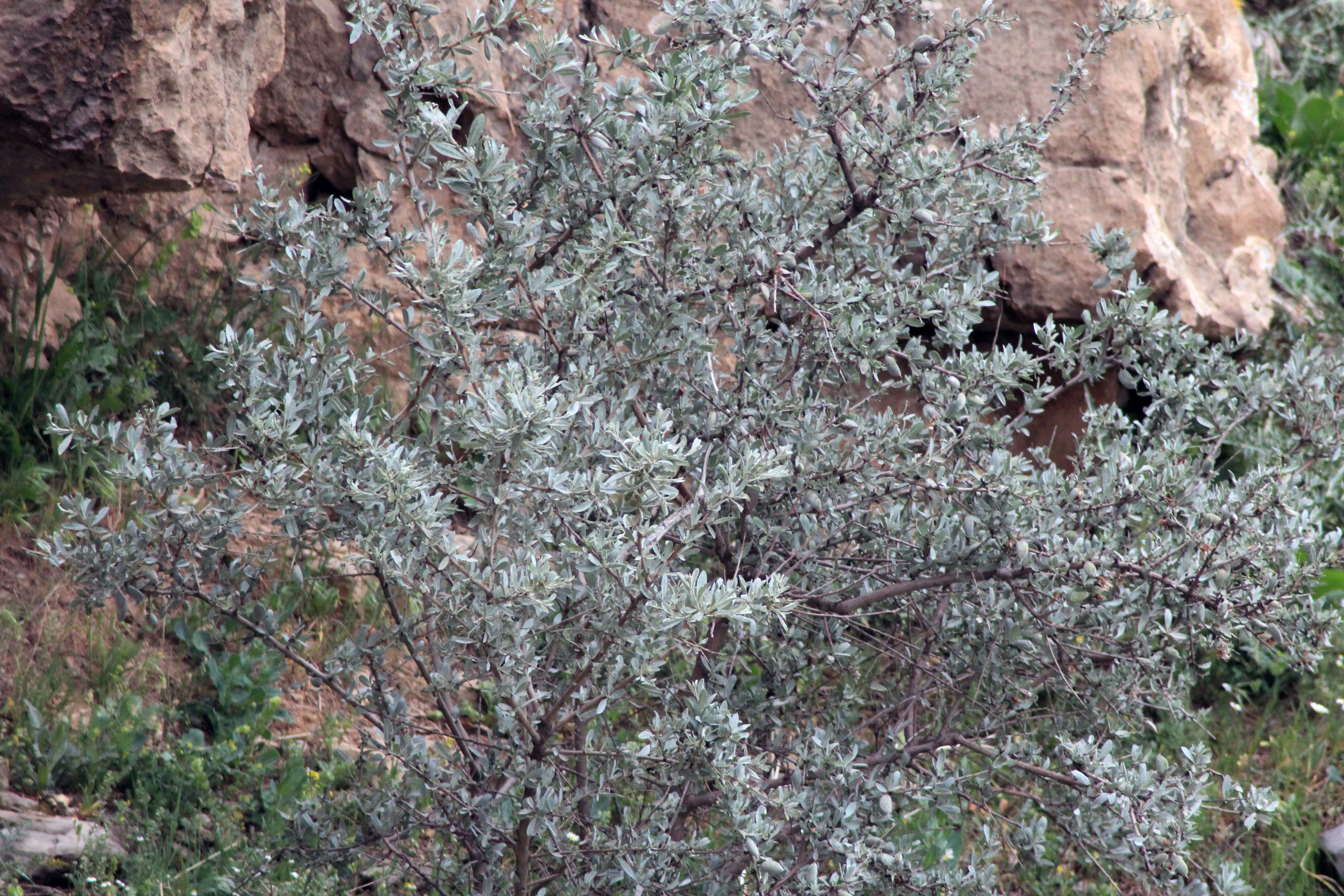
P. scoparia in the Gilazard Valley

Prunus scoparia is a wild almond primarily found in the Zagros forests of Iran but also distributed across Turkey, Turkmenistan, and Afghanistan. It is a xerophytic shrub and it has been used as a grafting stock for domesticated almonds to provide drought resistance.

Its seeds are consumed by rural Iranians as a cheap source of high-quality protein. Its leaves are the primary food of the larvae of Parornix turcmeniella moths. In recent scholarship, it is sometimes referenced as Persian gum after the model of gum arabic, although this name is also used for the commercially unimportant P. lycioides and for the resin of the unrelated Astragalus sarcocolla.
