= Parornix impressipenella =

Scientific classification
- Kingdom: Animalia
- Phylum: Arthropoda
- Clade: Pancrustacea
- Class: Insecta
- Order: Lepidoptera
- Family: Gracillariidae
- Genus: Parornix
- Species: P. impressipenella

Binomial name
- Parornix impressipenella (Bilimek, 1867)

Species of moth

Parornix impressipenella is a moth of the family Gracillariidae. It is known from Mexico.
