= Parornix persicella =

Scientific classification
- Kingdom: Animalia
- Phylum: Arthropoda
- Clade: Pancrustacea
- Class: Insecta
- Order: Lepidoptera
- Family: Gracillariidae
- Genus: Parornix
- Species: P. persicella

Binomial name
- Parornix persicella Danilevsky, 1955

Species of moth

Parornix persicella is a moth of the family Gracillariidae. It is known from the central Asian part of Russia, Iran, Kazakhstan, Tajikistan, Turkmenistan and Uzbekistan.

The larvae feed on Amygdalus and Persica species. They probably mine the leaves of their host plant.
