= Parornix fumidella =

Scientific classification
- Domain: Eukaryota
- Kingdom: Animalia
- Phylum: Arthropoda
- Class: Insecta
- Order: Lepidoptera
- Family: Gracillariidae
- Genus: Parornix
- Species: P. fumidella

Binomial name
- Parornix fumidella Kuznetzov, 1979

Species of moth

Parornix fumidella is a moth of the family Gracillariidae. It is known from the central Asian part of Russia and the Russian Far East.

The larvae feed on Malus mandshurica. They probably mine the leaves of their host plant.
