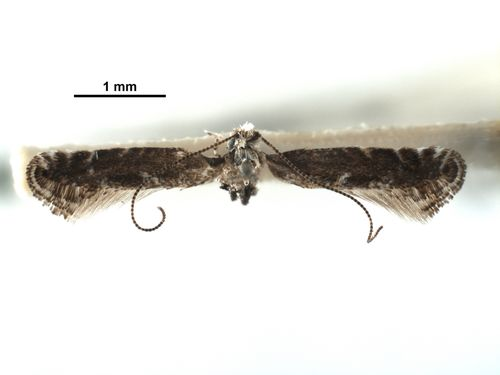

Scientific classification
- Kingdom: Animalia
- Phylum: Arthropoda
- Clade: Pancrustacea
- Class: Insecta
- Order: Lepidoptera
- Family: Gracillariidae
- Genus: Parornix
- Species: P. peregrinaella

Binomial name
- Parornix peregrinaella (Darlington, 1949)

= Parornix peregrinaella =

Species of moth

Parornix peregrinaella is a moth of the family Gracillariidae. It is known from Canada (Nova Scotia and Québec) and the United States (New Jersey and Vermont).

The larvae feed on Comptonia peregrina. They mine the leaves of their host plant.
