= Parornix boreasella =

Scientific classification
- Kingdom: Animalia
- Phylum: Arthropoda
- Clade: Pancrustacea
- Class: Insecta
- Order: Lepidoptera
- Family: Gracillariidae
- Genus: Parornix
- Species: P. boreasella

Binomial name
- Parornix boreasella (Clemens, 1864)

Synonyms
- Parornix boreella (Meyrick, 1912)

Species of moth

Parornix boreasella is a moth of the family Gracillariidae. It is known from Labrador and Québec in Canada and Pennsylvania in the United States.

The larvae feed on Betula lenta and Betula nigra. They mine the leaves of their host plant.
