= Parornix altaica =

Scientific classification
- Domain: Eukaryota
- Kingdom: Animalia
- Phylum: Arthropoda
- Class: Insecta
- Order: Lepidoptera
- Family: Gracillariidae
- Genus: Parornix
- Species: P. altaica

Binomial name
- Parornix altaica Noreika & Bidzilya, 2006

Species of moth

Parornix altaica is a moth of the family Gracillariidae. It is known from the central Asian part of Russia.
