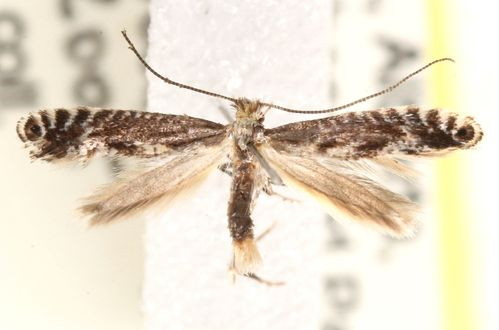

Scientific classification
- Kingdom: Animalia
- Phylum: Arthropoda
- Clade: Pancrustacea
- Class: Insecta
- Order: Lepidoptera
- Family: Gracillariidae
- Genus: Parornix
- Species: P. conspicuella

Binomial name
- Parornix conspicuella (Dietz, 1907)

Synonyms
- Ornix conspicuella Dietz, 1907

= Parornix conspicuella =

Species of moth

Parornix conspicuella is a moth of the family Gracillariidae. It is known from Québec, Canada, and Pennsylvania, Maine, Michigan and Vermont in the United States.

The larvae feed on Betula nigra. They mine the leaves of their host plant.
