= Parornix ornatella =

Scientific classification
- Kingdom: Animalia
- Phylum: Arthropoda
- Clade: Pancrustacea
- Class: Insecta
- Order: Lepidoptera
- Family: Gracillariidae
- Genus: Parornix
- Species: P. ornatella

Binomial name
- Parornix ornatella Triberti, 1981

Species of moth

Parornix ornatella is a moth of the family Gracillariidae. It is known from Austria.

The larvae feed on Amelanchier ovalis. They mine the leaves of their host plant.
