= Parornix subfinitimella =

Scientific classification
- Domain: Eukaryota
- Kingdom: Animalia
- Phylum: Arthropoda
- Class: Insecta
- Order: Lepidoptera
- Family: Gracillariidae
- Genus: Parornix
- Species: P. subfinitimella

Binomial name
- Parornix subfinitimella Kuznetzov, 1956

Species of moth

Parornix subfinitimella is a moth of the family Gracillariidae. It is known from Turkmenistan.

The larvae feed on Crataegus turkestanica. They mine the leaves of their host plant.
