= Parornix acuta =

Scientific classification
- Kingdom: Animalia
- Phylum: Arthropoda
- Clade: Pancrustacea
- Class: Insecta
- Order: Lepidoptera
- Family: Gracillariidae
- Genus: Parornix
- Species: P. acuta

Binomial name
- Parornix acuta Triberti, 1980

Species of moth

Parornix acuta is a moth of the family Gracillariidae. It is known from Cyprus, Crete, mainland Italy, Sicily and North Macedonia.
