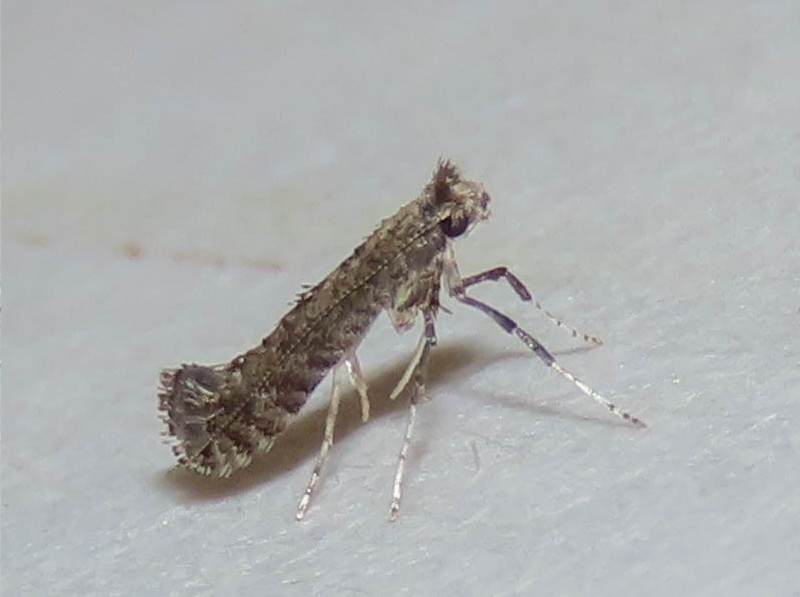

Scientific classification
- Kingdom: Animalia
- Phylum: Arthropoda
- Clade: Pancrustacea
- Class: Insecta
- Order: Lepidoptera
- Family: Gracillariidae
- Genus: Parornix
- Species: P. geminatella

Binomial name
- Parornix geminatella (Packard, 1869)

Synonyms
- Parornix pennivorella (Chambers, 1877); Parornix prunionella (Chambers, 1876); Parornix prunivorella (Chambers, 1873); Parornix puinrosella (Chambers, 1875)

= Parornix geminatella =

Species of moth

Parornix geminatella, the unspotted tentiform leafminer moth, is a moth of the family Gracillariidae. It is known from Québec, Canada, and Florida, Georgia, Maine, Maryland, New York, Vermont, Texas, Colorado, Missouri, Kentucky and Connecticut in the United States.

The larvae feed on Crataegus species, Cydonia species (including Cydonia oblonga), Malus species (including Malus pumila and Malus sylvestris), Prunus species (including Prunus avium, Prunus cerasus and Prunus serotina) and Pyrus species (including Pyrus communis). They mine the leaves of their host plant.
