= Parornix oculata =

Scientific classification
- Kingdom: Animalia
- Phylum: Arthropoda
- Clade: Pancrustacea
- Class: Insecta
- Order: Lepidoptera
- Family: Gracillariidae
- Genus: Parornix
- Species: P. oculata

Binomial name
- Parornix oculata (Triberti, 1979)

Species of moth

Parornix oculata is a moth of the family Gracillariidae. It is known from Greece and Turkey.
