= Parornix kumatai =

Scientific classification
- Kingdom: Animalia
- Phylum: Arthropoda
- Class: Insecta
- Order: Lepidoptera
- Family: Gracillariidae
- Genus: Parornix
- Species: P. kumatai

Binomial name
- Parornix kumatai Ermolaev, 1993

Species of moth

Parornix kumatai is a moth of the family Gracillariidae. It is known from Dagestan and the Russian Far East.

The larvae feed on Crataegus maximowiczii. They probably mine the leaves of their host plant.
