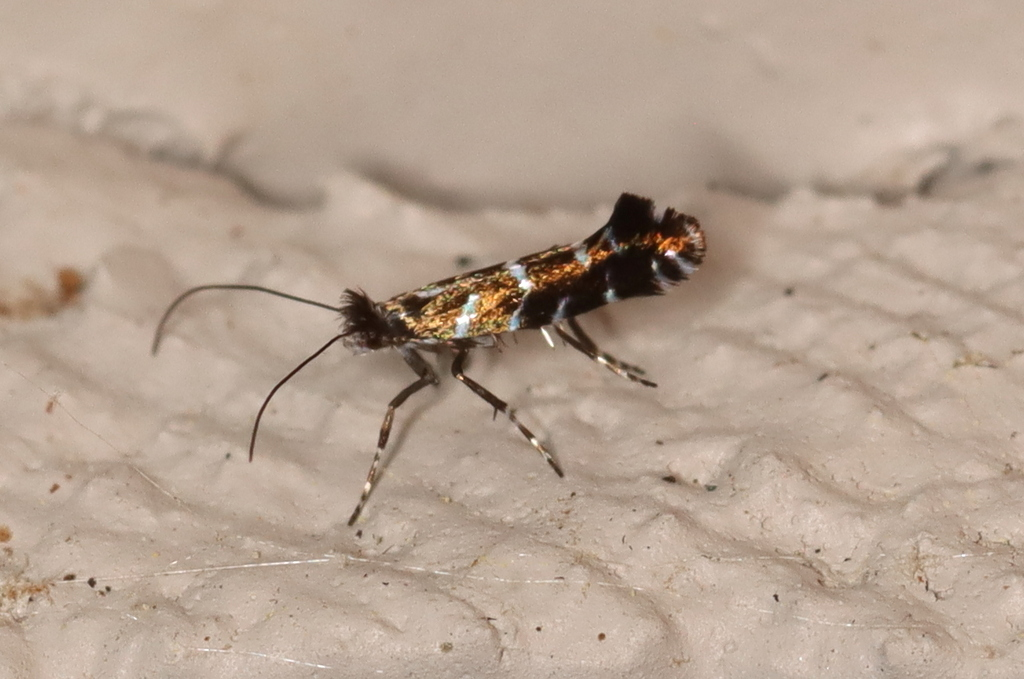

Scientific classification
- Kingdom: Animalia
- Phylum: Arthropoda
- Clade: Pancrustacea
- Class: Insecta
- Order: Lepidoptera
- Family: Gracillariidae
- Genus: Parornix
- Species: P. kalmiella

Binomial name
- Parornix kalmiella (Dietz, 1907)

Synonyms
- Ornix kalmiella Dietz, 1907; Parornix palmiella (Needham, Frost & Tothill, 1928)

= Parornix kalmiella =

Species of moth

Parornix kalmiella is a moth of the family Gracillariidae. It is known from Canada (Nova Scotia and Québec) the United States (Connecticut, Pennsylvania, Maine and Vermont).

The larvae feed on Kalmia angustifolia. They mine the leaves of their host plant.
