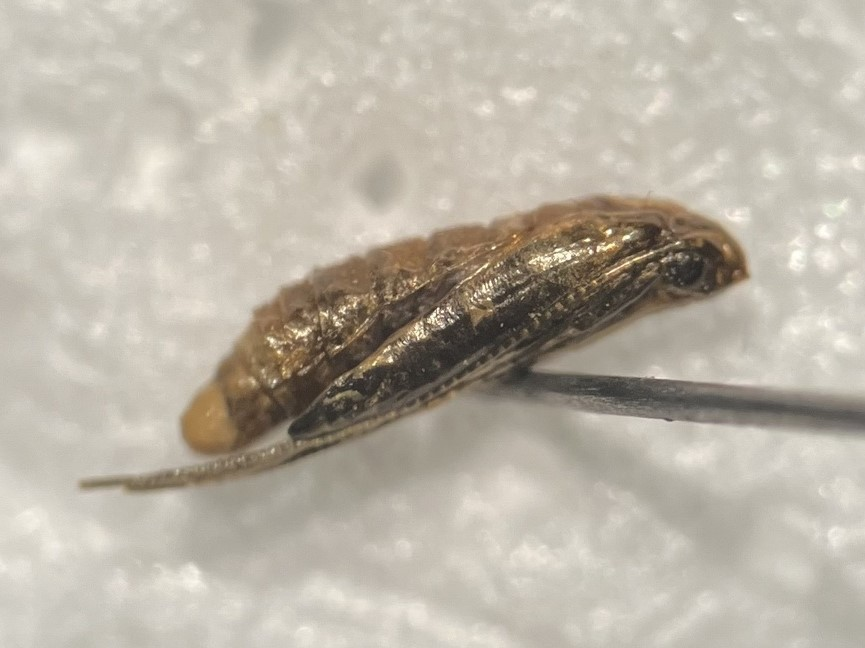
- Pupa

Scientific classification
- Kingdom: Animalia
- Phylum: Arthropoda
- Clade: Pancrustacea
- Class: Insecta
- Order: Lepidoptera
- Family: Gracillariidae
- Genus: Parornix
- Species: P. vicinella

Binomial name
- Parornix vicinella (Dietz, 1907)

Synonyms
- Ornix vicinella Dietz, 1907

= Parornix vicinella =

Species of moth

Parornix vicinella is a species of moth in the family Gracillariidae. It is known from the eastern United States (Pennsylvania and Maine).

The larvae feed on Betula alleghaniensis and Betula flava. They mine the leaves of their host plant.
