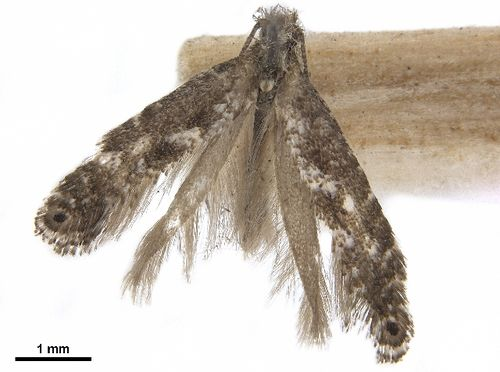

Scientific classification
- Kingdom: Animalia
- Phylum: Arthropoda
- Clade: Pancrustacea
- Class: Insecta
- Order: Lepidoptera
- Family: Gracillariidae
- Genus: Parornix
- Species: P. strobivorella

Binomial name
- Parornix strobivorella (Dietz, 1907)

Synonyms
- Ornix strobivorella Dietz, 1907; Parornix sorbivorella Forbes, 1923

= Parornix strobivorella =

Species of moth

Parornix strobivorella is a moth of the family Gracillariidae. It is known from Pennsylvania and Maine in the United States.

The larvae feed on Pyrus and Sorbus species. They mine the leaves of their host plant.
