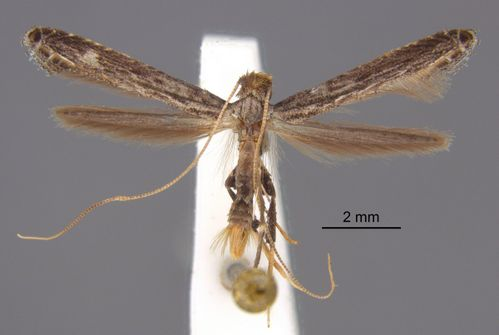

Scientific classification
- Kingdom: Animalia
- Phylum: Arthropoda
- Clade: Pancrustacea
- Class: Insecta
- Order: Lepidoptera
- Family: Gracillariidae
- Genus: Parornix
- Species: P. texanella

Binomial name
- Parornix texanella (Busck, 1906)

= Parornix texanella =

Species of moth

Parornix texanella is a moth of the family Gracillariidae. It is known from Texas, United States.
