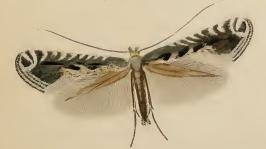

Scientific classification
- Kingdom: Animalia
- Phylum: Arthropoda
- Clade: Pancrustacea
- Class: Insecta
- Order: Lepidoptera
- Family: Gracillariidae
- Genus: Parornix
- Species: P. torquillella

Binomial name
- Parornix torquillella (Zeller, 1850)

Synonyms
- Ornix torquillella Zeller, 1850; Deltaornix torquillella

= Parornix torquillella =

Species of moth

Parornix torquillella is a moth of the family Gracillariidae found in Europe. The larvae mine the leaves of Prunus species, such as blackthorn (Prunus spinosa). It was described by the German entomologist Philipp Christoph Zeller in 1850, from specimens found in Florence, Leghorn and Pisa.

== Description ==
The wingspan is 9–13 mm. The head is pale ochreous mixed with fuscous. Palpi white. Forewings are rather dark fuscous, purplish-tinged, towards dorsum and costa more blackish numerous costal streaks, a spot in disc posteriorly, and two or three dorsal spots white; a black apical dot, strongly white edged anteriorly; cilia with three entire dark fuscous lines. Hind wings are grey. The larva is pale yellow -green; dorsal line dark green or reddish; head pale yellow; segment 2 with four black spots. Very similar to Parornix finitimella genitalia examination is necessary to identify both.

The larvae feed on dwarf cherry (Prunus cerasus), plums (Prunus domestica), Damson (Prunus insititia), beach plum (Prunus maritima) and blackthorn (Prunus spinosa). They mine the leaves of their host plant.

== Distribution ==
It is known from all of Europe, except Spain and parts of the Balkan Peninsula.

== Gallery ==
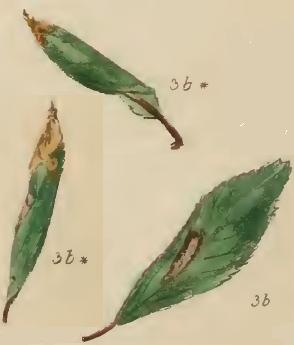
Blackthorn leaf with the mine of a young larva (3b); and blackthorn leaves screwed up by a late instar larva (3b*)

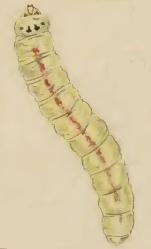
Larva

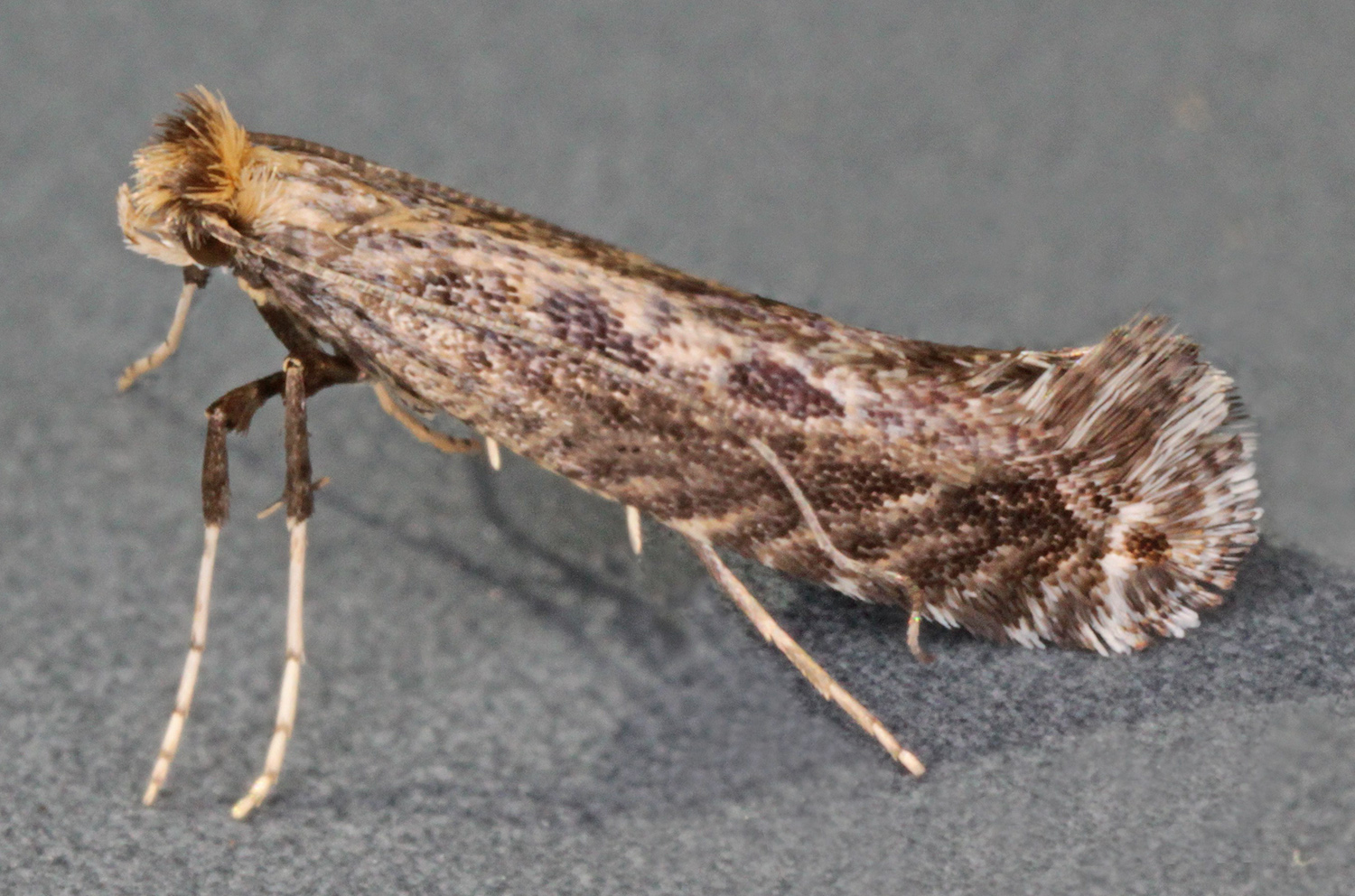
Imago

== Taxonomy ==
The genus Paronix comes from para, meaning alongside and ornix named after the genus Ornix Treitschke, 1833, which refers to ornis, a bird. The genus Ornix originally included a wide range of feathery-winged microlepidoptera in the Coleophoridae and the Gracillariidae. Ornix was an early synonym of the genus Coleophora as a number of moths were name after birds. The feathery-winged moths were later restricted to Paronix. The specific name torquillella comes from torquis – a collar, ″from the prothoracic plate of the larva, which consists of four transversely placed black spots.
