= Parornix fragilella =

Scientific classification
- Kingdom: Animalia
- Phylum: Arthropoda
- Clade: Pancrustacea
- Class: Insecta
- Order: Lepidoptera
- Family: Gracillariidae
- Genus: Parornix
- Species: P. fragilella

Binomial name
- Parornix fragilella Triberti, 1981

Species of moth

Parornix fragilella is a moth of the family Gracillariidae. It is known from Greece and North Macedonia.
