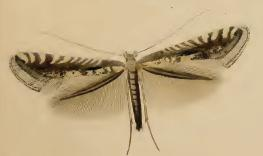

Scientific classification
- Kingdom: Animalia
- Phylum: Arthropoda
- Class: Insecta
- Order: Lepidoptera
- Family: Gracillariidae
- Genus: Parornix
- Species: P. fagivora

Binomial name
- Parornix fagivora (Frey, 1861)

Synonyms
- Ornix fagivora Frey, 1861

= Parornix fagivora =

Species of moth

Parornix fagivora is a moth of the family Gracillariidae. It is found from Sweden to the Pyrenees, Italy and Albania and from Great Britain to southern Russia.

A piece of beech leaf with its edge turned down by the adult larva

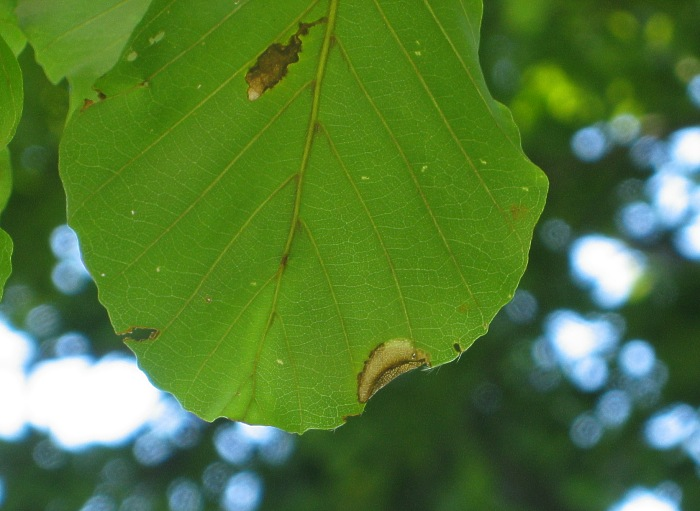
Damage

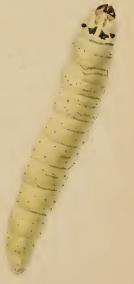
Larva

The wingspan is 11–14 mm.

The larvae feed on Fagus sylvatica, including subspecies Fagus sylvatica orientalis. They mine the leaves of their host plant.
