= Parornix kugitangi =

Scientific classification
- Domain: Eukaryota
- Kingdom: Animalia
- Phylum: Arthropoda
- Class: Insecta
- Order: Lepidoptera
- Family: Gracillariidae
- Genus: Parornix
- Species: P. kugitangi

Binomial name
- Parornix kugitangi Noreika, 1991

Species of moth

Parornix kugitangi is a moth of the family Gracillariidae. It is known from Turkmenistan and Uzbekistan.
