= Parornix cotoneasterella =

Scientific classification
- Domain: Eukaryota
- Kingdom: Animalia
- Phylum: Arthropoda
- Class: Insecta
- Order: Lepidoptera
- Family: Gracillariidae
- Genus: Parornix
- Species: P. cotoneasterella

Binomial name
- Parornix cotoneasterella Kuznetzov, 1978

Species of moth

Parornix cotoneasterella is a moth of the family Gracillariidae. It is known from Tajikistan and Turkmenistan.

The larvae feed on Cotoneaster avellana and Cotoneaster hissarica. They probably mine the leaves of their host plant.
