= Parornix extrema =

Scientific classification
- Domain: Eukaryota
- Kingdom: Animalia
- Phylum: Arthropoda
- Class: Insecta
- Order: Lepidoptera
- Family: Gracillariidae
- Genus: Parornix
- Species: P. extrema

Binomial name
- Parornix extrema Kuznetzov & Baryschnikova, 2003

Species of moth

Parornix extrema is a moth of the family Gracillariidae. It is known from the Russian Far East.
