= Parornix asiatica =

Scientific classification
- Domain: Eukaryota
- Kingdom: Animalia
- Phylum: Arthropoda
- Class: Insecta
- Order: Lepidoptera
- Family: Gracillariidae
- Genus: Parornix
- Species: P. asiatica

Binomial name
- Parornix asiatica Noreika, 1991

Species of moth

Parornix asiatica is a moth of the family Gracillariidae. It is known from Tajikistan and Turkmenistan.

The larvae feed on Rosaceae species. They probably mine the leaves of their host plant.
