= Parornix compsumpta =

Scientific classification
- Kingdom: Animalia
- Phylum: Arthropoda
- Clade: Pancrustacea
- Class: Insecta
- Order: Lepidoptera
- Family: Gracillariidae
- Genus: Parornix
- Species: P. compsumpta

Binomial name
- Parornix compsumpta Triberti, 1987

Species of moth

Parornix compsumpta is a moth of the family Gracillariidae. It is known from the Peloponnisos region in Greece and North Macedonia.
