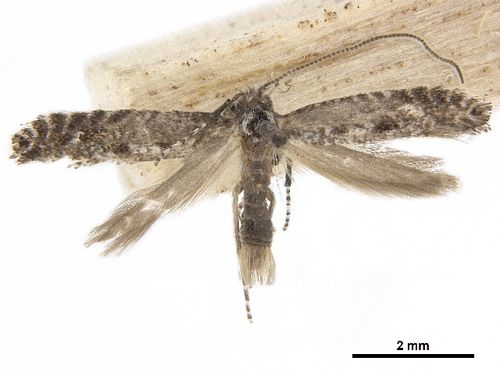

Scientific classification
- Kingdom: Animalia
- Phylum: Arthropoda
- Clade: Pancrustacea
- Class: Insecta
- Order: Lepidoptera
- Family: Gracillariidae
- Genus: Parornix
- Species: P. innotata

Binomial name
- Parornix innotata (Walsingham, 1907)

= Parornix innotata =

Species of moth

Parornix innotata is a moth of the family Gracillariidae. It is known from Georgia, Maine and Maryland in the United States.
