= Parornix concussa =

Scientific classification
- Kingdom: Animalia
- Phylum: Arthropoda
- Class: Insecta
- Order: Lepidoptera
- Family: Gracillariidae
- Genus: Parornix
- Species: P. concussa

Binomial name
- Parornix concussa (Meyrick, 1933)

Species of moth

Parornix concussa is a moth of the family Gracillariidae. It is known from Jammu and Kashmir, India.
