= Parornix multimaculata =

Scientific classification
- Kingdom: Animalia
- Phylum: Arthropoda
- Clade: Pancrustacea
- Class: Insecta
- Order: Lepidoptera
- Family: Gracillariidae
- Genus: Parornix
- Species: P. multimaculata

Binomial name
- Parornix multimaculata (Matsumura, 1931)

Synonyms
- Lyoneta multimaculata Matsumura, 1931; Callisto multimaculata

Species of moth

Parornix multimaculata is a moth of the family Gracillariidae. It is known from the Japan (Hokkaidō), Korea and the Russian Far East.

The wingspan is 8.5–12 mm.

The larvae feed on Malus baccata, Prunus avium, Prunus maximowiczii, Prunus mume, Prunus sachalinensis, Prunus salicina, Prunus sargentii and Prunus ussuriensis. They mine the leaves of their host plant.
