= Parornix micrura =

Scientific classification
- Domain: Eukaryota
- Kingdom: Animalia
- Phylum: Arthropoda
- Class: Insecta
- Order: Lepidoptera
- Family: Gracillariidae
- Genus: Parornix
- Species: P. micrura

Binomial name
- Parornix micrura Walsingham, 1914

Species of moth

Parornix micrura is a moth of the family Gracillariidae. It is known from Mexico.
