= Parornix turcmeniella =

Scientific classification
- Domain: Eukaryota
- Kingdom: Animalia
- Phylum: Arthropoda
- Class: Insecta
- Order: Lepidoptera
- Family: Gracillariidae
- Genus: Parornix
- Species: P. turcmeniella

Binomial name
- Parornix turcmeniella Kuznetzov, 1956

Species of moth

Parornix turcmeniella is a moth of the family Gracillariidae. It is known from Turkmenistan.

The larvae feed on P. scoparia. They mine the leaves of their host plant.
