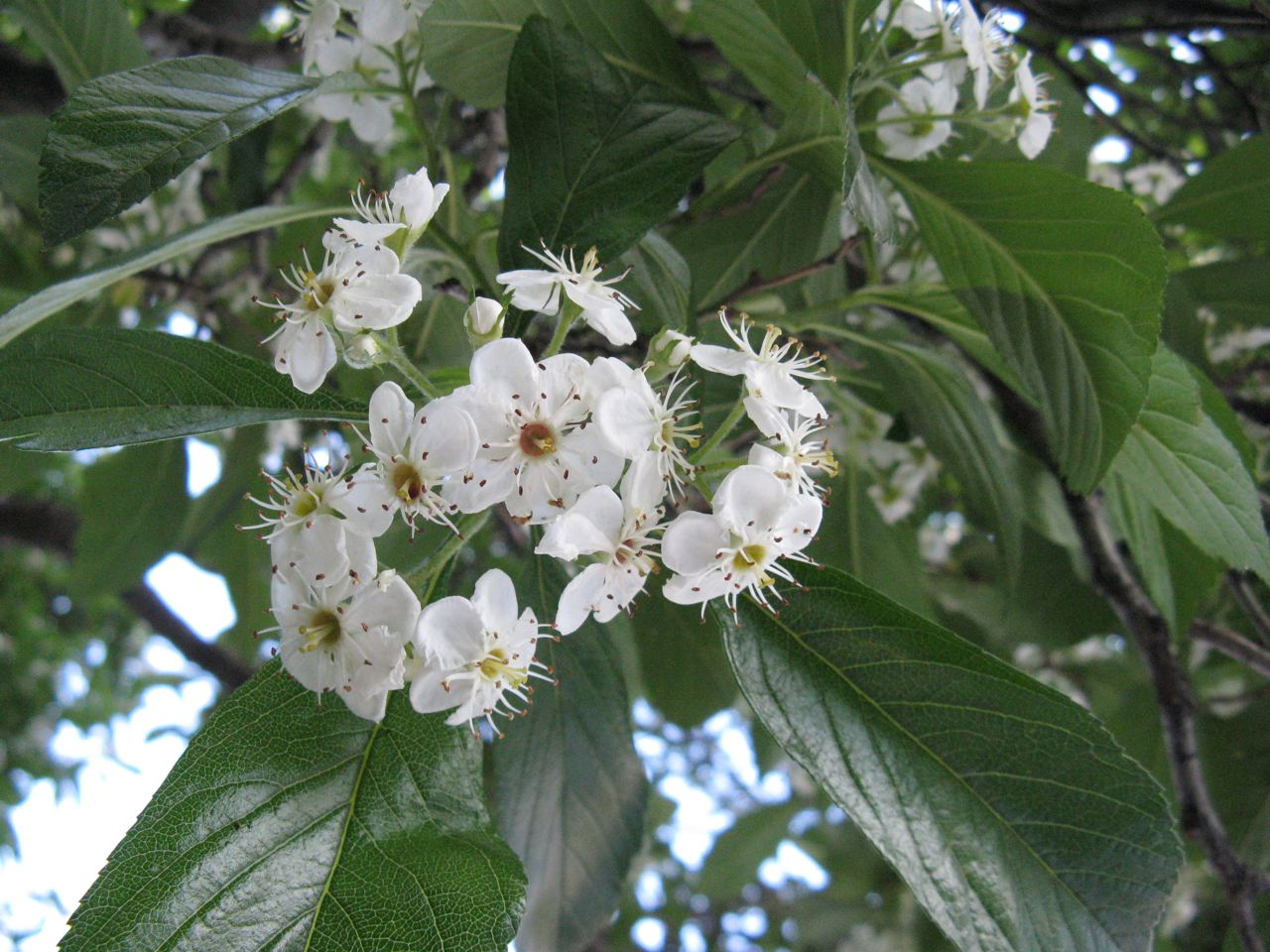

Scientific classification
- Kingdom: Plantae
- Clade: Tracheophytes
- Clade: Angiosperms
- Clade: Eudicots
- Clade: Rosids
- Order: Rosales
- Family: Rosaceae
- Genus: Crataegus
- Species: C. × lavalleei

Binomial name
- Crataegus × lavalleei Hèrincq ex Lavallée

Synonyms
- Crataegus × carrierei Vauvel

= Crataegus × lavalleei =

Species of hawthorn

Crataegus × lavalleei, sometimes known as hybrid cockspurthorn or Lavallée's hawthorn, is a hybrid that arose between cultivated specimens of two species in the genus Crataegus (hawthorn). It is an ornamental small tree with glossy dark green unlobed leaves that is used horticulturally.

The female parent was C. mexicana (sometimes mistakenly called C. pubescens), and the male parent is thought to be C. calpodendron (which is sometimes mistakenly called C. crus-galli).

Carrière's hawthorn, C. × carrierei has the same parentage, and is therefore a synonym, i.e. the same species. There are minor differences between Lavallée's hawthorn and Carrière's hawthorn, and the latter is considered a separate cultivar, which is formally written as Crataegus 'Carrierei'. It has gained the Royal Horticultural Society's Award of Garden Merit. The leaves turn red before falling very late in the season. This cultivar is also characterised by almost thornless stems, and abundant orange berries which last long on the tree.
