= Parornix loricata =

Scientific classification
- Kingdom: Animalia
- Phylum: Arthropoda
- Clade: Pancrustacea
- Class: Insecta
- Order: Lepidoptera
- Family: Gracillariidae
- Genus: Parornix
- Species: P. loricata

Binomial name
- Parornix loricata Triberti, 1998

Species of moth

Parornix loricata is a moth of the family Gracillariidae. It is known from Italy.
