= Parornix tenella =

Scientific classification
- Domain: Eukaryota
- Kingdom: Animalia
- Phylum: Arthropoda
- Class: Insecta
- Order: Lepidoptera
- Family: Gracillariidae
- Genus: Parornix
- Species: P. tenella

Binomial name
- Parornix tenella (Rebel, 1919)

Synonyms
- Ornix tenella Rebel, 1919

Species of moth

Parornix tenella is a moth of the family Gracillariidae. It is known from Austria, Croatia, the Czech Republic, Hungary, Sicily, mainland Italy, Romania, Slovakia, Spain and Ukraine.
