= Arnold Spuler =

German physician, entomologist and politician

Arnold Spuler (1 June 1869, Durmersheim – 15 March 1937, Aidenried, Upper Bavaria) was a German physician, an entomologist and a politician.

== Biography ==
After attending the gymnasium in Karlsruhe, Spuler was drafted in the 30th Regiment of Field Artillery of Baden (XIV Corps of the German Empire) from 1887 to 1888. He then studied natural sciences and medicine in Freiburg im Breisgau and Berlin. In 1891 he graduated and in 1893 he was qualified to practice as a physician. In the autumn of the same year he became assistant of the Institute of Anatomy at the University of Erlangen. In 1896 he obtained the libera docenza and in 1903 he became an extraordinary professor. From 1914 to 1918 he took part in the First World War as a medical officer. After the war he enrolled in the German National People's Party (DNVP). In 1920 he became full professor of histology and ontogenesis at the University of Erlangen. From 1920 to 1924 he was deputy of his party in the Bavarian Parliament and from December 1924 to May 1928 in the National Parliament of the Weimar Republic, where he represented his constituency (Upper Bavaria and Swabia).

== Scientific activity ==
Spuler wrote treatises on anatomy, ontogeny, biology and zoology, and books on Lepidoptera. The multi-volume work Die Schmetterlinge Europas (The Lepidoptera of Europe) of 1908 was for decades a standard in the study of Lepidoptera.

== Works ==
(in German )

- Zur Phylogenie und Ontogenie des Flügelgeäders der Schmetterlinge. 1892.
- Beiträge zur Histologie und Histiogenese der Binde- und Stützsubstanz. Wiesbaden 1896.
- Beiträge zur Histogenese des Mesenchyms. 1897.
- Übersicht der lepidopteren-Fauna des Grossherzogtums. Baden 1898.
- Über die Teilungserscheinungen der Eizelle in degenerierenden Follikeln des Säugerovariums. Wiesbaden 1901.
- Die Raupen der Schmetterlinge Europas. 1904.
- Die Schmetterlinge Europas. 1908. (with Ernst Hofmann)
- Die sogenannten Kleinschmetterlinge Europas einschließlich der primitiven Familien der sogenannten Grossschmetterlinge, sowie der Nolidae, Syntomidae, Nycteolidae und Arctiidae. Stuttgart 1913. (dissertation)
