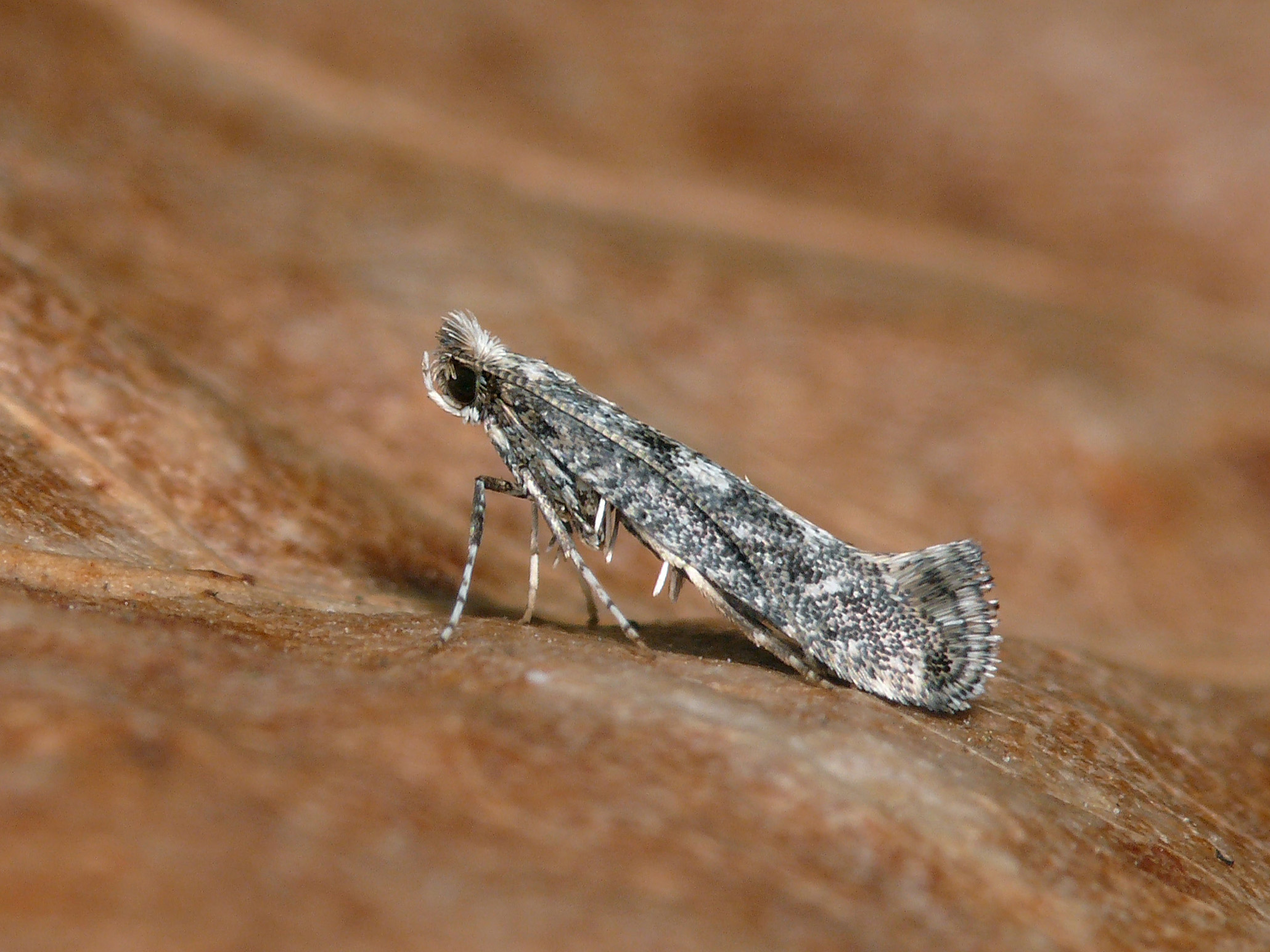

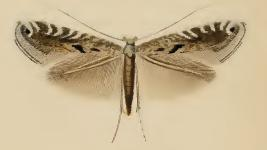

Scientific classification
- Kingdom: Animalia
- Phylum: Arthropoda
- Clade: Pancrustacea
- Class: Insecta
- Order: Lepidoptera
- Family: Gracillariidae
- Genus: Parornix
- Species: P. betulae

Binomial name
- Parornix betulae (Stainton, 1854)

Synonyms
- Ornix betulae Stainton, 1854

= Parornix betulae =

Species of moth

Parornix betulae is a moth of the family Gracillariidae. It is known from all of Europe (except the Iberian Peninsula, the Balkan Peninsula and the Mediterranean islands), east to Korea. It was recently reported from Canada, with records from Québec, Ontario and British Columbia.

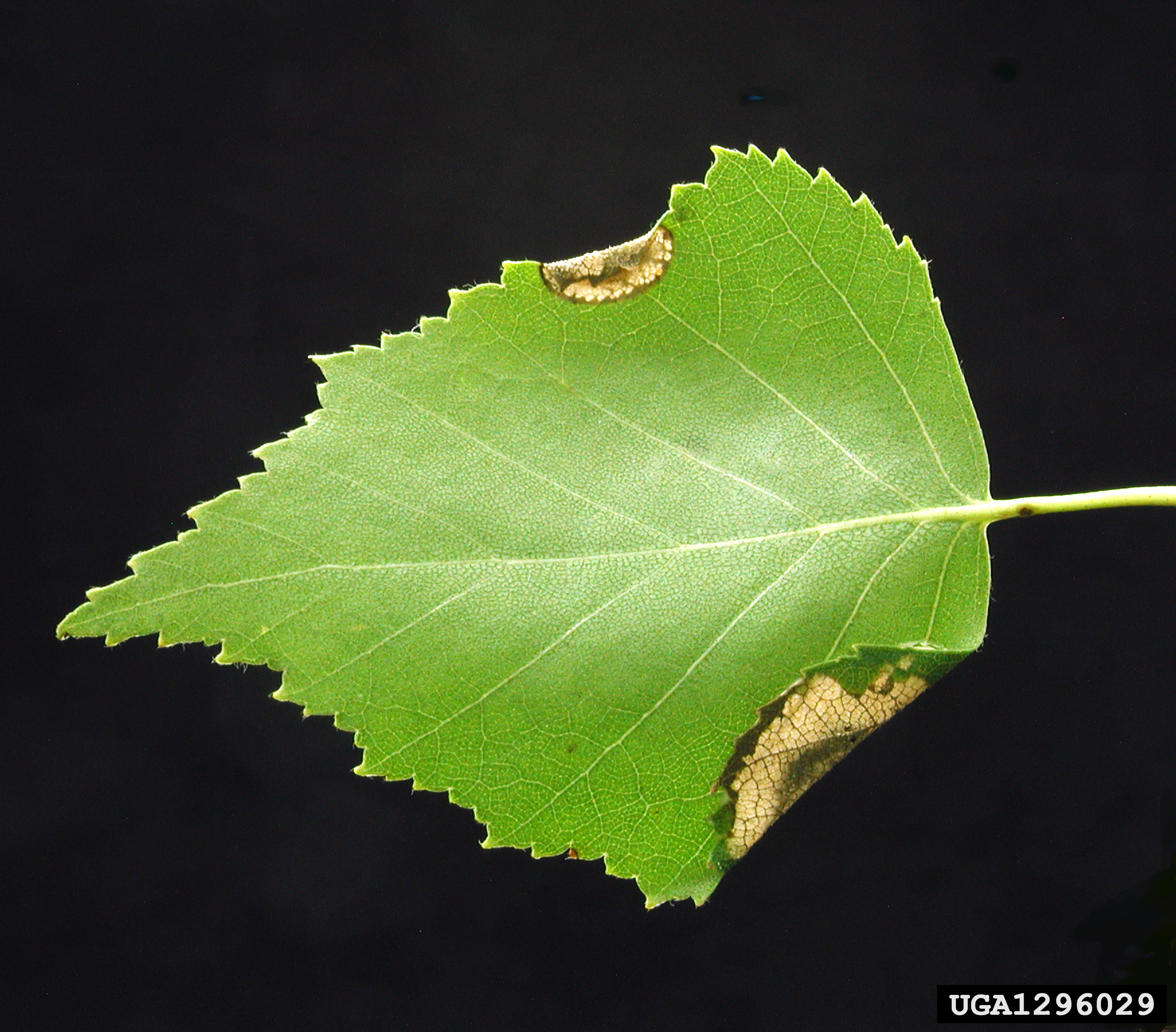
Damage

Larva

The wingspan is 9–10 mm. The head is fuscous, more or less mixed with white. Palpi white, sometimes with dark fuscous subapical ring. Forewings are grey, irrorated with dark fuscous and white; numerous costal strigulae, a spot in middle of disc and another posteriorly, and two dorsal spots white; a blackish apical spot; cilia with two dark fuscous lines, tips round apex white, beneath apex with a third dark fuscous line. Hindwings are grey. The larva is whitish green; dorsal line dark green; head brownish; segment 2 with four black spots.

Adults are on wing in May and August.

The larvae feed on Betula alleghaniensis, Betula grossa, Betula humilis, Betula obscura, Betula papyrifera, Betula pendula, Betula pubescens, Betula nana and Betula utilis. They mine the leaves of their host plant.
