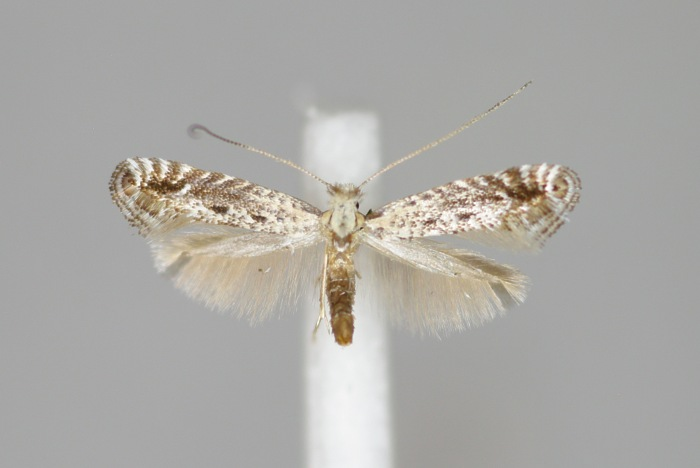
- Parornix scoticella Salzburg, Austria
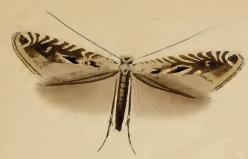

Scientific classification
- Kingdom: Animalia
- Phylum: Arthropoda
- Clade: Pancrustacea
- Class: Insecta
- Order: Lepidoptera
- Family: Gracillariidae
- Genus: Parornix
- Species: P. scoticella

Binomial name
- Parornix scoticella (Stainton, 1850)

Synonyms
- Ornix scoticella Stainton, 1850

= Parornix scoticella =

Species of moth

Parornix scoticella is a moth of the family Gracillariidae. It is known from all of Europe.

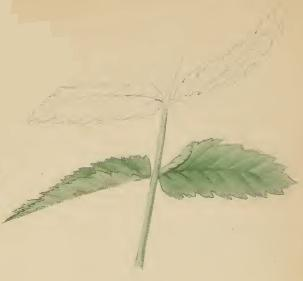
Some leaflets of Sorbus aucuparia with turned-down edges

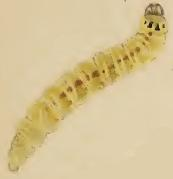
Larva

The wingspan is about 10 mm. The head is whitish, mixed with fuscous. Palpi white. Forewings are dark fuscous, towards base irrorated with white: numerous costal strigulae, a spot in disc posteriorly, and two dorsal spots preceded by blackish spots white; a black apical spot, anteriorly white-margined; cilia with three entire dark fuscous lines. Hindwings are grey. The larva is pale yellow-green; dorsal line dark green or red-brown; head pale brown; segment 2 with four black spots.

Adults are on wing in May and again in August in two generations in southern parts of the range and in one generation with adults in August in the north.

The larvae feed on Cotoneaster nebrodensis, Malus sylvestris, Sorbus aria, Sorbus aucuparia, Sorbus chamaemespilus, Sorbus intermedia and Sorbus torminalis. They mine the leaves of their host plant.
