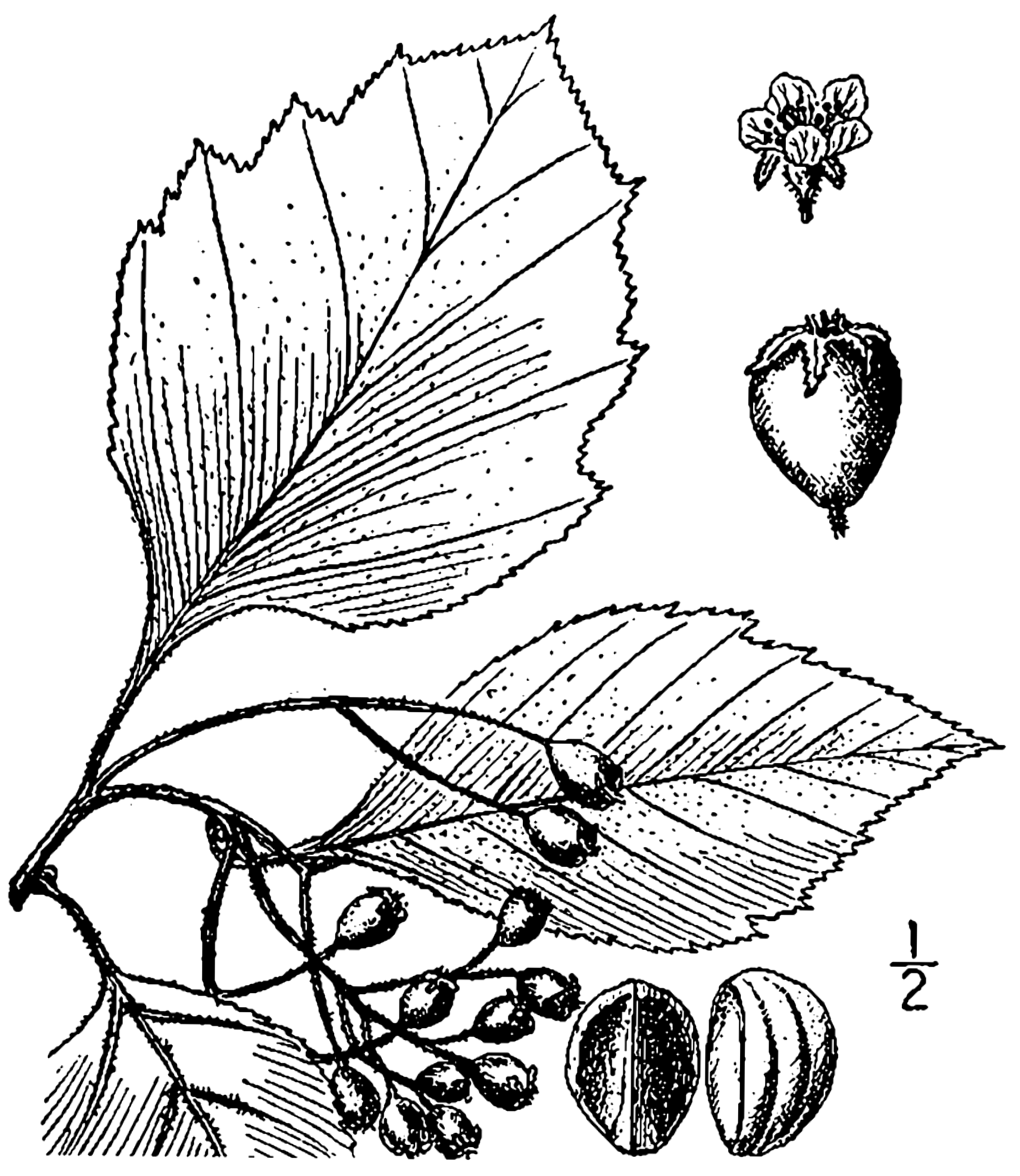

Conservation status
- Least Concern (IUCN 3.1)

Scientific classification
- Kingdom: Plantae
- Clade: Tracheophytes
- Clade: Angiosperms
- Clade: Eudicots
- Clade: Rosids
- Order: Rosales
- Family: Rosaceae
- Genus: Crataegus
- Section: Crataegus sect. Coccineae
- Series: Crataegus ser. Macracanthae
- Species: C. calpodendron

Binomial name
- Crataegus calpodendron (Ehrh.) Medik.

= Crataegus calpodendron =

Species of hawthorn

Crataegus calpodendron is a species of hawthorn native to much of the eastern United States and to Ontario, Canada. The common name late hawthorn refers to the flowering time, which is later than most North American hawthorns.

According to James B. Phipps, this species may be the male parent of Crataegus × lavalleei.
