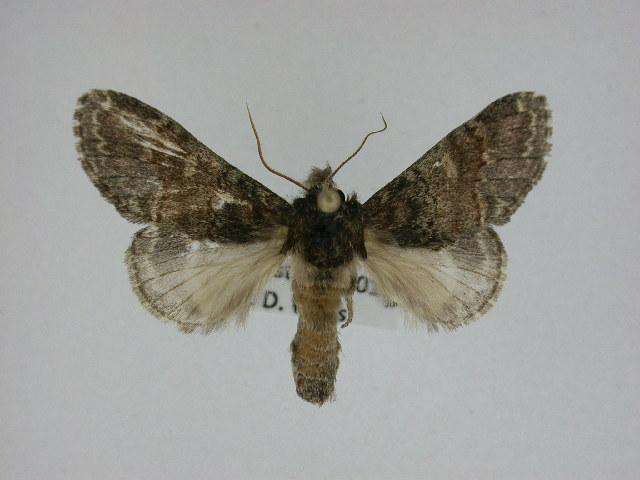

Scientific classification
- Kingdom: Animalia
- Phylum: Arthropoda
- Clade: Pancrustacea
- Class: Insecta
- Order: Lepidoptera
- Superfamily: Noctuoidea
- Family: Notodontidae
- Genus: Peridea
- Species: P. ferruginea

Binomial name
- Peridea ferruginea (Packard, 1864)

Synonyms
- Lophodonta ferruginea Packard, 1864

= Peridea ferruginea =

Species of moth

Peridea ferruginea, the chocolate prominent, is a species of prominent moth in the family Notodontidae. It was described by Alpheus Spring Packard in 1864 and is found in North America. In 2018, Miller et al. distinguished Peridea bordeloni, whose larvae specialize on river birch Betula nigra, as a separate species, though P. bordeloni has previously been identified as P. ferruginea.

The MONA or Hodges number for Peridea ferruginea is 7921.
