= Pseudotelphusa tornimacula =

Scientific classification
- Domain: Eukaryota
- Kingdom: Animalia
- Phylum: Arthropoda
- Class: Insecta
- Order: Lepidoptera
- Family: Gelechiidae
- Genus: Pseudotelphusa
- Species: P. tornimacula

Binomial name
- Pseudotelphusa tornimacula Janse, 1958

Species of moth

Pseudotelphusa tornimacula is a moth of the family Gelechiidae. It is found in Zimbabwe and South Africa.
