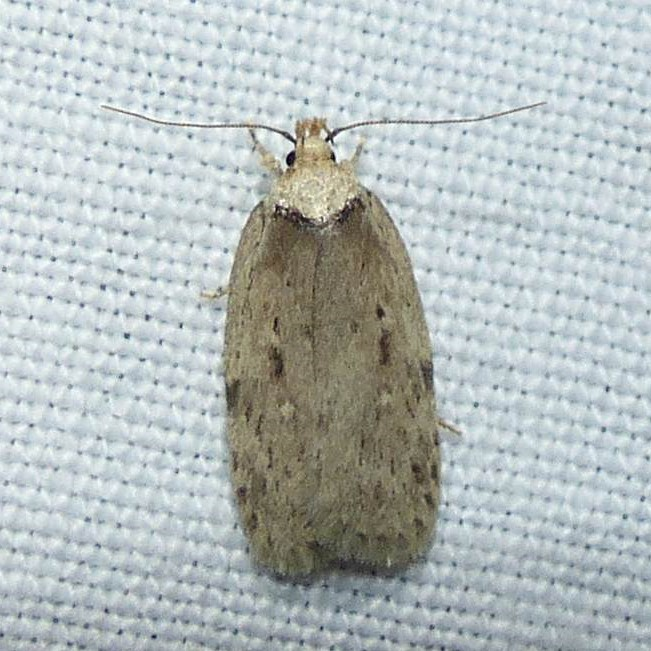
- Nites betulella

Scientific classification
- Kingdom: Animalia
- Phylum: Arthropoda
- Clade: Pancrustacea
- Class: Insecta
- Order: Lepidoptera
- Family: Depressariidae
- Subfamily: Depressariinae
- Genus: Nites; Hodges, 1974

= Nites =

Genus of moths

Nites is a genus of moths in the family Depressariidae.

== Species ==
- Nites atrocapitella McDunnough, 1944
- Nites betulella Busck, 1902
- Nites grotella Robinson, 1870
- Nites maculatella Busck, 1908
- Nites ostryella McDunnough, 1943
