= Pseudotelphusa amelanchierella =

Scientific classification
- Domain: Eukaryota
- Kingdom: Animalia
- Phylum: Arthropoda
- Class: Insecta
- Order: Lepidoptera
- Family: Gelechiidae
- Genus: Pseudotelphusa
- Species: P. amelanchierella

Binomial name
- Pseudotelphusa amelanchierella (Braun, 1930)

Synonyms
- Telphusa amelanchierella Braun, 1930

Species of moth

Pseudotelphusa amelanchierella is a moth of the family Gelechiidae. It is found in North America, where it has been recorded from Ohio.

The wingspan is about 9.5-10.5 mm.

The larvae feed on the leaves of Amelanchier canadensis.
