= Pseudotelphusa confixa =

Scientific classification
- Kingdom: Animalia
- Phylum: Arthropoda
- Class: Insecta
- Order: Lepidoptera
- Family: Gelechiidae
- Genus: Pseudotelphusa
- Species: P. confixa

Binomial name
- Pseudotelphusa confixa (Meyrick, 1918)

Synonyms
- Telphusa confixa Meyrick, 1918

Species of moth

Pseudotelphusa confixa is a moth of the family Gelechiidae first described by Edward Meyrick in 1918. It is found in South Africa.

The wingspan is 11–12 mm. The forewings are dark grey suffusedly irrorated (sprinkled) with white, with some black scales and with elongate blackish spots on the costa near the base, before the middle, and at two-thirds. There is a black streak from beneath the first of these along the fold to near the extremity. The discal stigmata are black connected by a black dash, the second followed by a disconnected black dash running nearly to the apex. There are cloudy black marginal dots around the posterior part of the costa and termen. The hindwings are grey, thinly scaled towards the base.
