= Pseudotelphusa betulella =

Scientific classification
- Kingdom: Animalia
- Phylum: Arthropoda
- Class: Insecta
- Order: Lepidoptera
- Family: Gelechiidae
- Genus: Pseudotelphusa
- Species: P. betulella

Binomial name
- Pseudotelphusa betulella (Busck, 1903)

Synonyms
- Telphusa betulella Busck, 1903

Species of moth

Pseudotelphusa betulella is a moth of the family Gelechiidae. It is found in North America, where it has been recorded from Maine, Virginia, the District of Columbia and Mississippi.

The wingspan is 12–13 mm. The forewings are silvery white suffused irregularly with drab scales, especially below the fold and in the apical part. The extreme base of the costa is black and there is a small dark drab costal spot at the middle of the wing. Near the base of the wing, just below the costa, is a large tuft of raised scales and there are similar smaller tufts of raised scales on the middle of the fold, at the end of the disc and beyond the disc. These are not very conspicuous and of the general colour of the wing. The hindwings are light silvery grey.

The larvae feed on Betula nigra.
