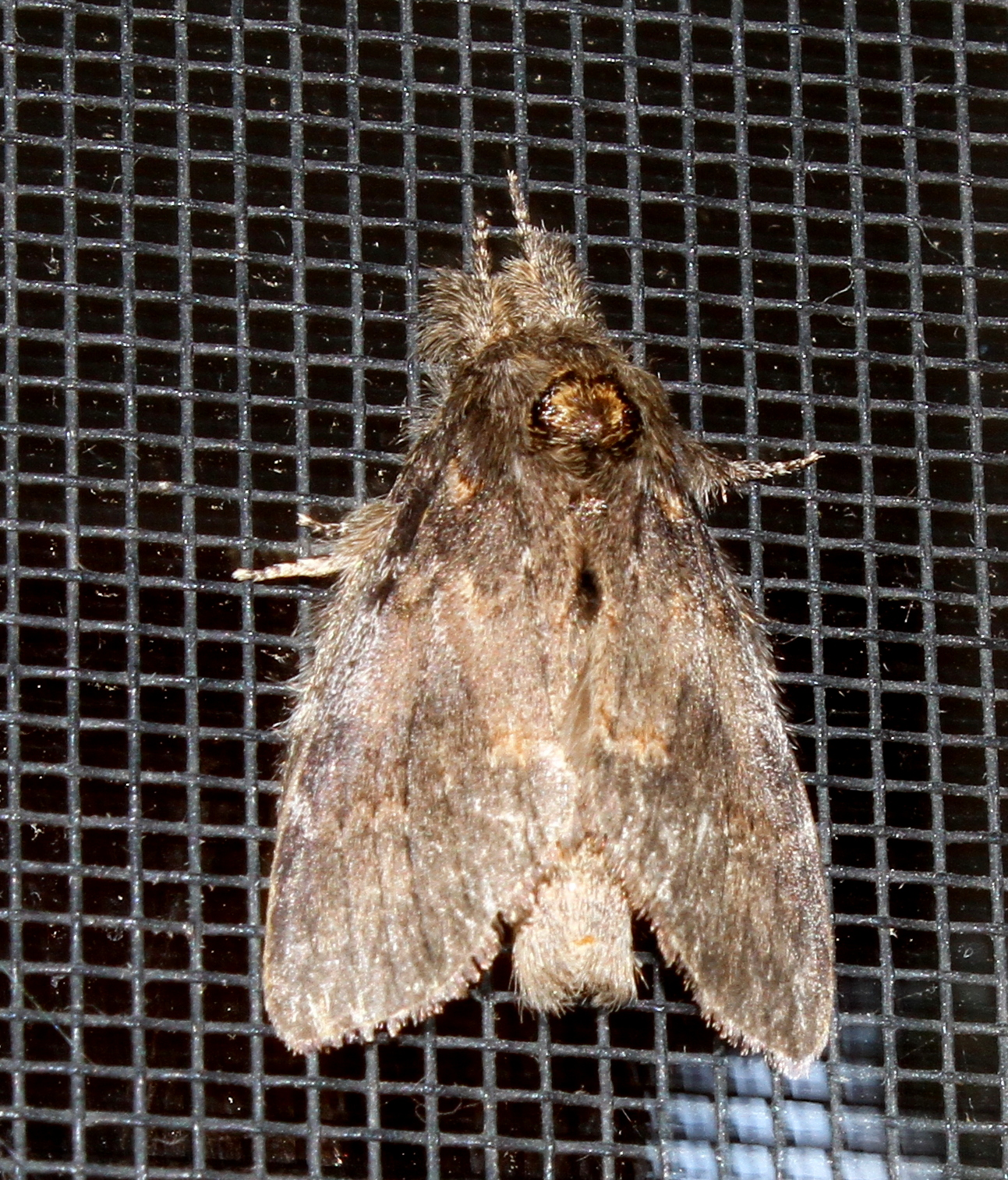
- Adult
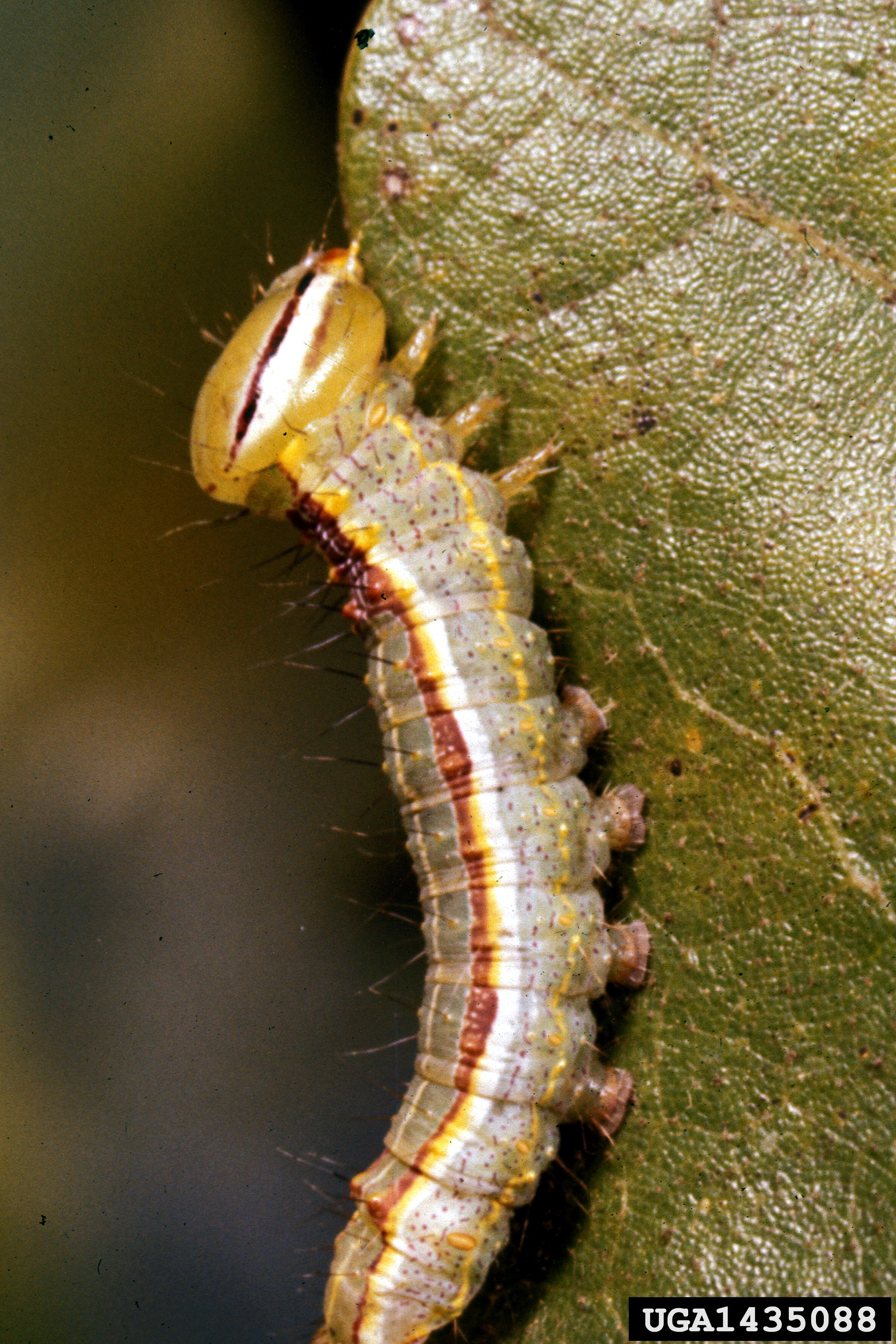
- Larvae

Scientific classification
- Kingdom: Animalia
- Phylum: Arthropoda
- Clade: Pancrustacea
- Class: Insecta
- Order: Lepidoptera
- Superfamily: Noctuoidea
- Family: Notodontidae
- Genus: Peridea
- Species: P. angulosa

Binomial name
- Peridea angulosa (J. E. Smith, 1797)

Synonyms
- Phalaena angulosa J. E. Smith, 1797

= Peridea angulosa =

Species of moth

Peridea angulosa, the angulose prominent, is a moth of the family Notodontidae. The species was first described by James Edward Smith in 1797. Its range consists of southern Canada, south to Florida and west to Texas.

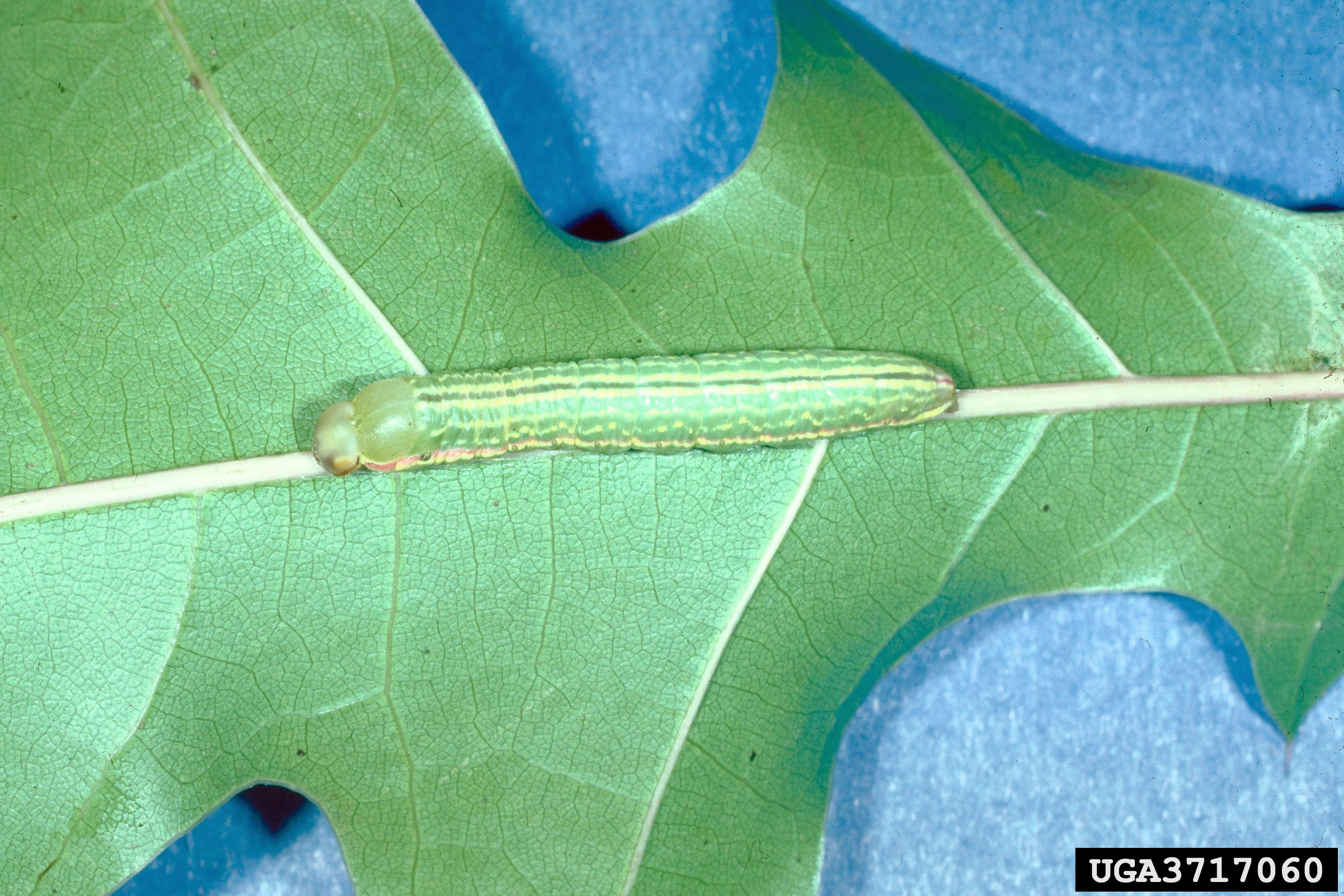

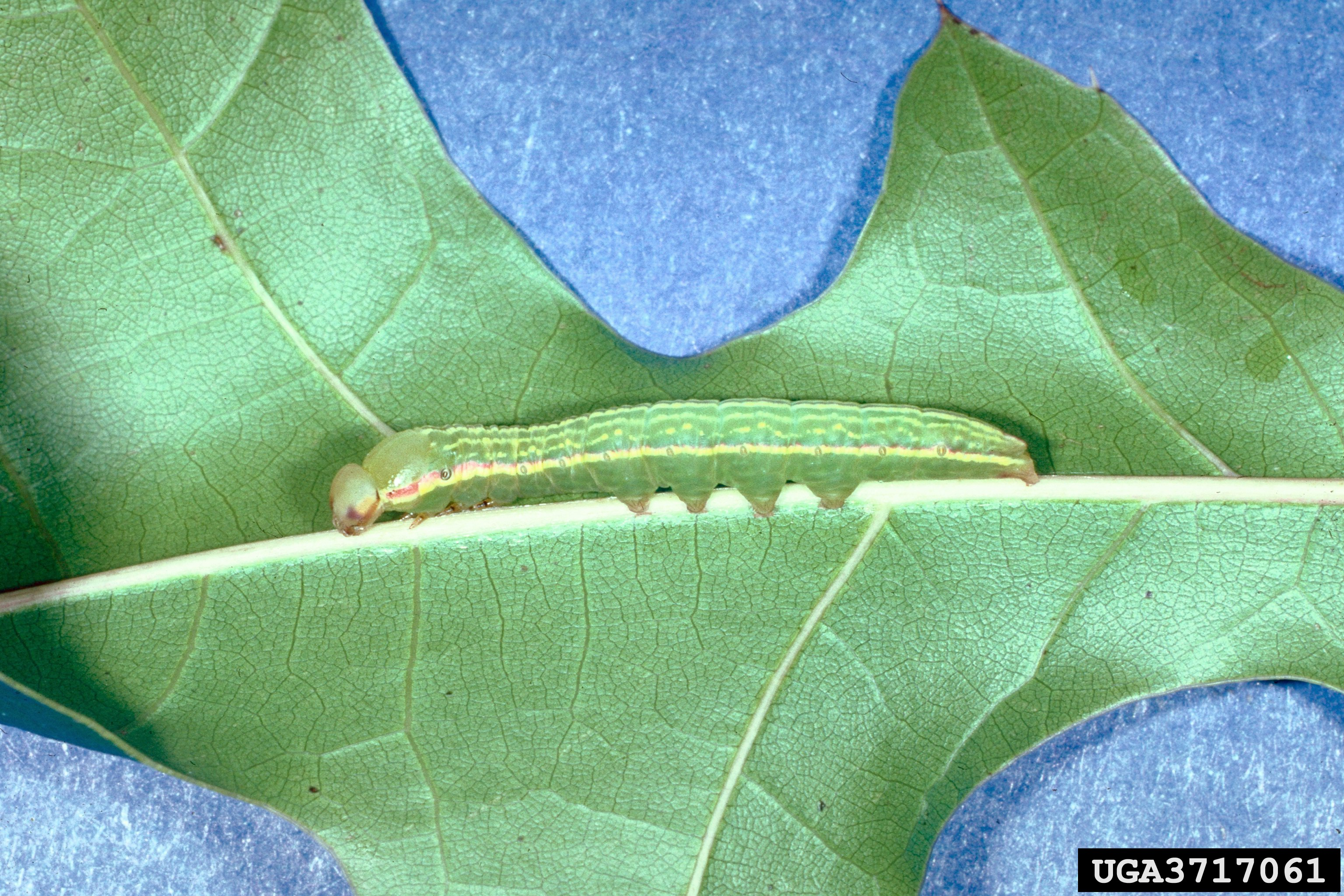

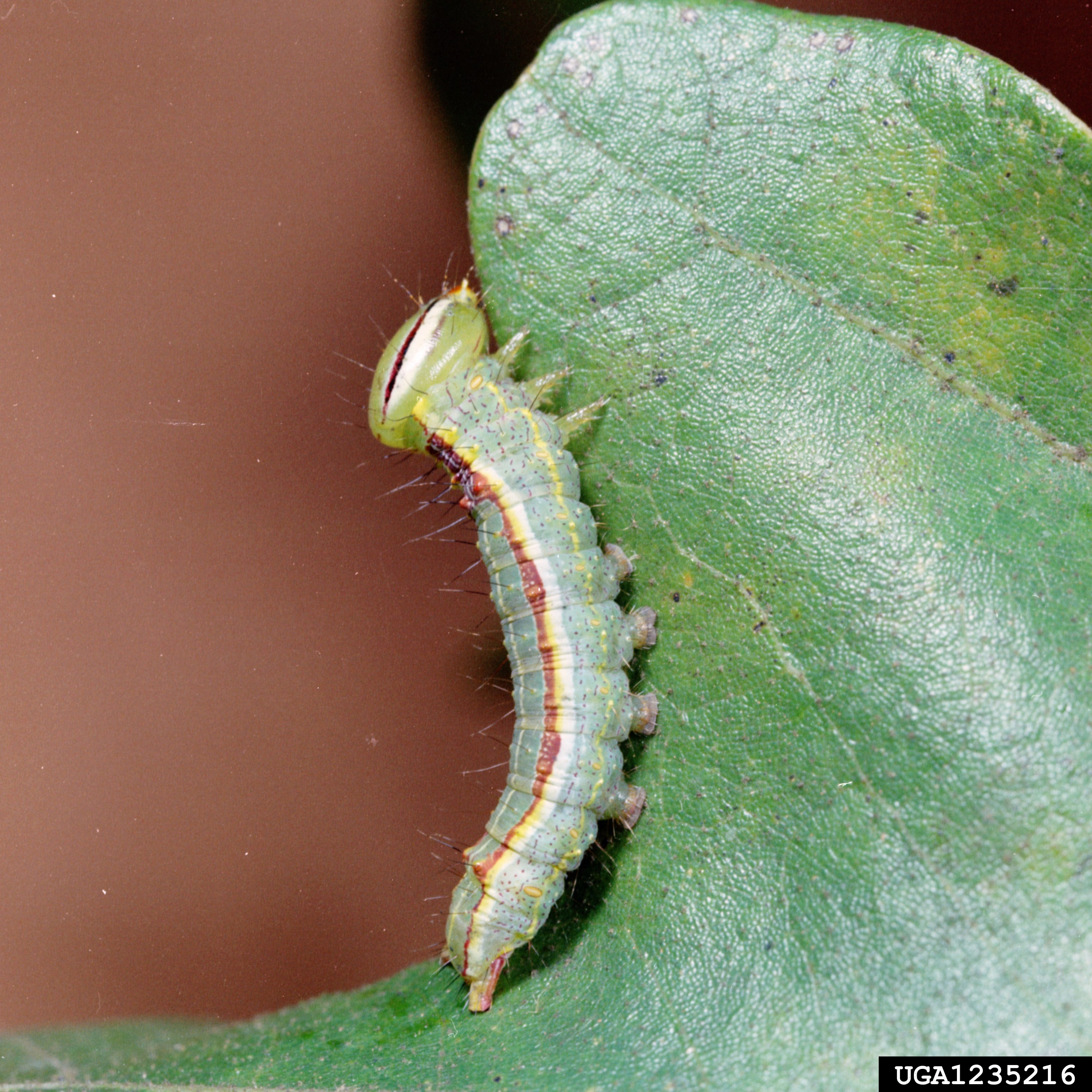

The wingspan is 35–45 mm. Adults are on wing from May to August.

The larvae feed on Quercus species.
