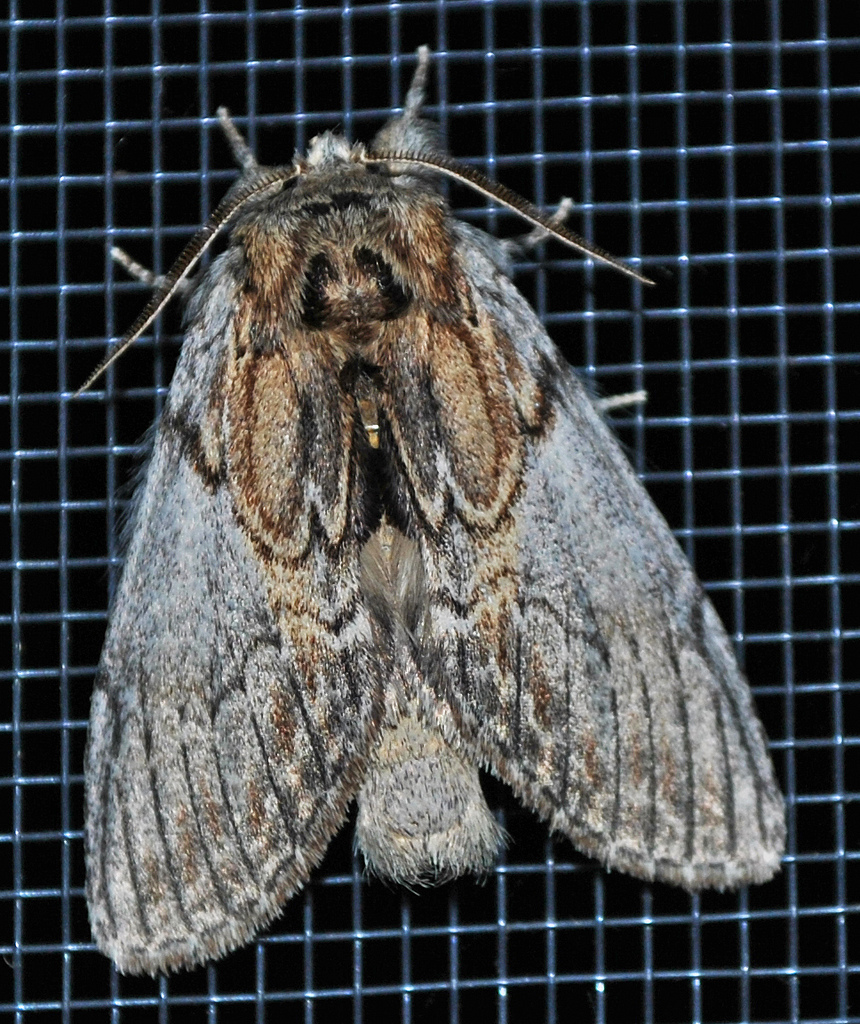
- Peridea basitriens

Scientific classification
- Kingdom: Animalia
- Phylum: Arthropoda
- Clade: Pancrustacea
- Class: Insecta
- Order: Lepidoptera
- Superfamily: Noctuoidea
- Family: Notodontidae
- Subfamily: Notodontinae
- Genus: Peridea; Stephens, 1828

= Peridea =

Genus of moths

Peridea is a genus of moths of the family Notodontidae described by Stephens in 1828.

== Species ==
- Peridea anceps (Goeze, 1781)
- Peridea korbi (Rebel, 1918)
- Peridea monetaria (Oberthür, 1879)
- Peridea lativitta (Wileman, 1911)
- Peridea dichroma Kiriakoff, 1959
- Peridea elzet Kiriakoff, 1963
- Peridea hoenei Kiriakoff, 1963
- Peridea graeseri (Staudinger, 1892)
- Peridea aliena (Staudinger, 1892)
- Peridea moltrechti (Oberthür, 1911)
- Peridea grahami (Schaus, 1928)
- Peridea gigantea Butler, 1877
- Peridea oberthueri (Staudinger, 1892)
- Peridea sikkima (Moore, 1879)
- Peridea albipuncta (Gaede, 1930)
- Peridea basitriens (Walker, 1855)
- Peridea angulosa (Smith, 1797)
- Peridea ferruginea (Packard, 1864)
