= Pseudotelphusa acrobrunella =

Scientific classification
- Kingdom: Animalia
- Phylum: Arthropoda
- Class: Insecta
- Order: Lepidoptera
- Family: Gelechiidae
- Genus: Pseudotelphusa
- Species: P. acrobrunella

Binomial name
- Pseudotelphusa acrobrunella Park, 1992

Species of moth

Pseudotelphusa acrobrunella is a moth of the family Gelechiidae. It is found in Korea, Japan and the Russian Far East.

The wingspan is 11–13 mm. Adults are on wing from early May to early August, probably in two generations per year in Korea.

The larvae feed on the leaves of Quercus species.
