= Pseudotelphusa floridana =

Scientific classification
- Domain: Eukaryota
- Kingdom: Animalia
- Phylum: Arthropoda
- Class: Insecta
- Order: Lepidoptera
- Family: Gelechiidae
- Genus: Pseudotelphusa
- Species: P. floridana

Binomial name
- Pseudotelphusa floridana Lee, 2011

Species of moth

Pseudotelphusa floridana is a moth of the family Gelechiidae. It is found in North America, where it has been recorded from Florida.
