= Nites maculatella =

Scientific classification
- Kingdom: Animalia
- Phylum: Arthropoda
- Clade: Pancrustacea
- Class: Insecta
- Order: Lepidoptera
- Family: Depressariidae
- Genus: Nites
- Species: N. maculatella

Binomial name
- Nites maculatella (Busck, 1908)

Synonyms
- Depressaria maculatella Busck, 1908

Species of moth

Nites maculatella is a moth in the family Depressariidae. It was described by August Busck in 1908. It is found in North America, where it has been recorded from Vermont, Ontario, Pennsylvania, Ohio, Indiana, Kentucky, Maine, Maryland and West Virginia.

The wingspan is 21–23 mm. The forewings are ochreous white, suffused with brown and irrorated (speckled) and streaked with blackish fuscous, with much ochreous scaling. There is a transverse blackish fuscous line at the extreme base, from the costa to the inner angle, interrupted at the middle by the white ground color. There is a poorly defined white discal spot at the basal third, preceded by some blackish fuscous scales and there is a similar spot at the end of the cell. Between the two is a conspicuous longitudinal, blackish-fuscous streak. Veins nine and ten are strongly marked with blackish fuscous and the bases of the other veins less conspicuously so. There is a blackish-fuscous spot on the costa, about the middle and a series of blackish-fuscous spots from the apical third of the costa, around the termen to the inner margin. The hindwings are whitish fuscous, darker apically.

The larvae feed on Carpinus caroliniana.
