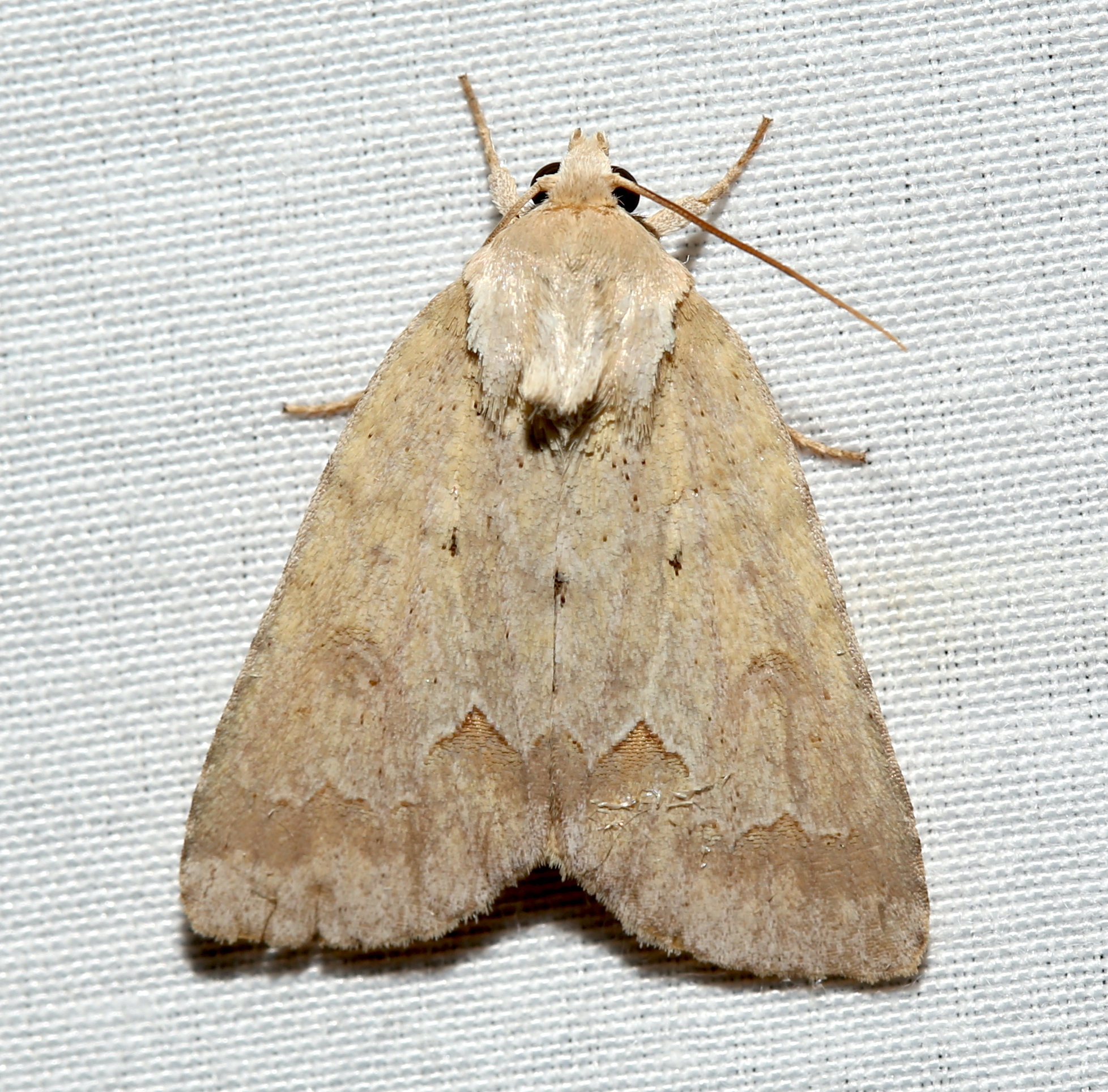

Scientific classification
- Kingdom: Animalia
- Phylum: Arthropoda
- Clade: Pancrustacea
- Class: Insecta
- Order: Lepidoptera
- Superfamily: Noctuoidea
- Family: Noctuidae
- Genus: Acronicta
- Species: A. betulae

Binomial name
- Acronicta betulae Riley, 1884

= Acronicta betulae =

Species of moth

Acronicta betulae, commonly known as the birch dagger moth, is a moth of the family Noctuidae. It is found from New Hampshire to Florida, west to Texas, north to Wisconsin.

The wingspan is 35–40 mm (1.4–1.6 in). Adults are on wing from March to May and from August to September in two generations.

The larvae feed on the leaves of birch, possibly exclusively Betula nigra.
