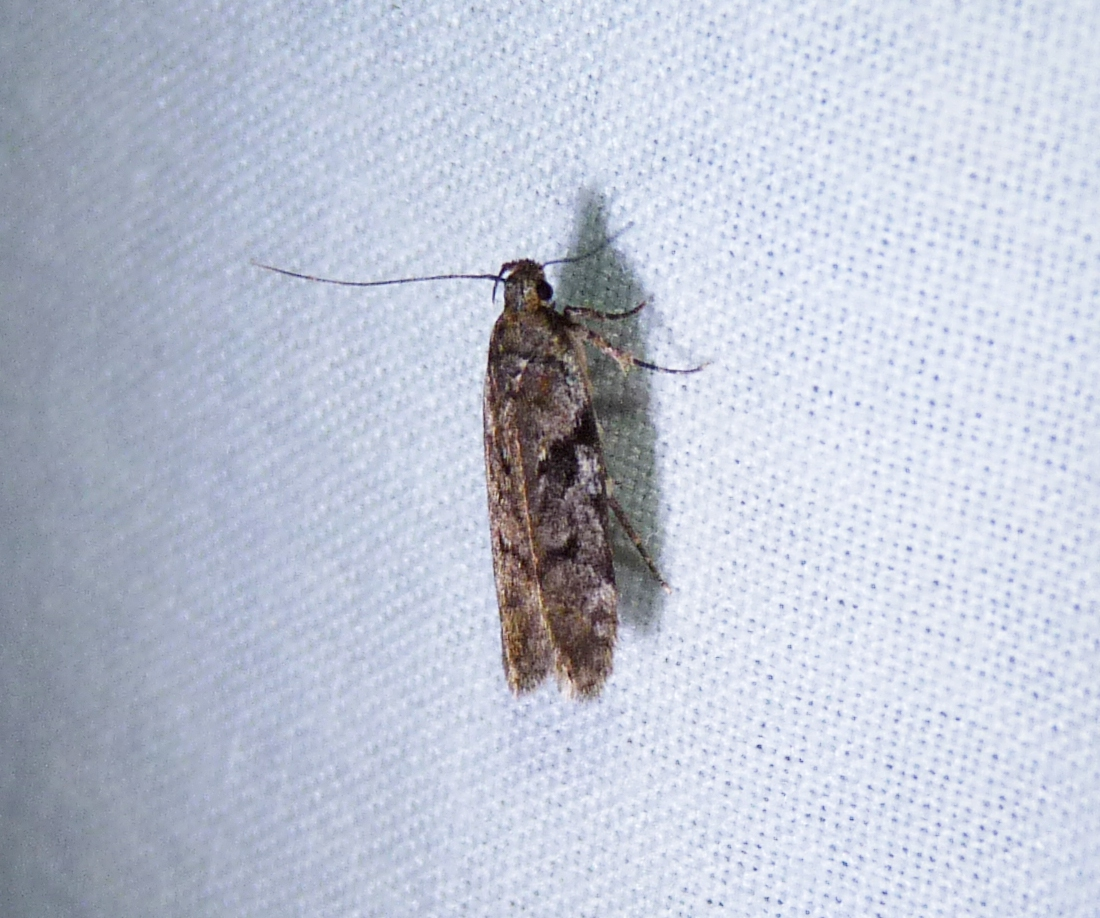

Scientific classification
- Kingdom: Animalia
- Phylum: Arthropoda
- Clade: Pancrustacea
- Class: Insecta
- Order: Lepidoptera
- Family: Gelechiidae
- Genus: Pseudotelphusa
- Species: P. quercinigracella

Binomial name
- Pseudotelphusa quercinigracella (Chambers, 1872)

Synonyms
- Gelechia quercinigracella Chambers, 1872; Gelechia fragmentella Zeller, 1873; Telphusa quercinigrella Meyrick, 1925

= Pseudotelphusa quercinigracella =

Species of moth

Pseudotelphusa quercinigracella is a moth of the family Gelechiidae. It is found in the United States, including Kentucky, Maryland and Oklahoma.
