= Pseudotelphusa albopasta =

Scientific classification
- Kingdom: Animalia
- Phylum: Arthropoda
- Clade: Pancrustacea
- Class: Insecta
- Order: Lepidoptera
- Family: Gelechiidae
- Genus: Pseudotelphusa
- Species: P. albopasta

Binomial name
- Pseudotelphusa albopasta Janse, 1960

Species of moth

Pseudotelphusa albopasta is a moth of the family Gelechiidae. It is found in South Africa.
