= Pseudotelphusa incana =

Scientific classification
- Kingdom: Animalia
- Phylum: Arthropoda
- Clade: Pancrustacea
- Class: Insecta
- Order: Lepidoptera
- Family: Gelechiidae
- Genus: Pseudotelphusa
- Species: P. incana

Binomial name
- Pseudotelphusa incana Hodges, 1969

Species of moth

Pseudotelphusa incana is a moth of the family Gelechiidae. It is found in North America, where it has been recorded from New York.

The wingspan is 10–12 mm.

The larvae feed on Malus sylvestris.
