= Pseudotelphusa ontariensis =

Scientific classification
- Domain: Eukaryota
- Kingdom: Animalia
- Phylum: Arthropoda
- Class: Insecta
- Order: Lepidoptera
- Family: Gelechiidae
- Genus: Pseudotelphusa
- Species: P. ontariensis

Binomial name
- Pseudotelphusa ontariensis Lee, 2011

Species of moth

Pseudotelphusa ontariensis is a moth of the family Gelechiidae. It is found in North America, where it has been recorded from Ontario.

The larvae feed on Quercus alba.
