= Nites ostryella =

Scientific classification
- Domain: Eukaryota
- Kingdom: Animalia
- Phylum: Arthropoda
- Class: Insecta
- Order: Lepidoptera
- Family: Depressariidae
- Genus: Nites
- Species: N. ostryella

Binomial name
- Nites ostryella (McDunnough, 1943)

Synonyms
- Depressaria ostryella McDunnough, 1943

Species of moth

Nites ostryella is a moth in the family Depressariidae. It was described by James Halliday McDunnough in 1943. It is found in North America, where it has been recorded from Ontario, Michigan, Pennsylvania, Maine and Illinois.

Adults have been recorded on wing from April to August.

The larvae feed on Ostrya virginiana and Corylus species.
