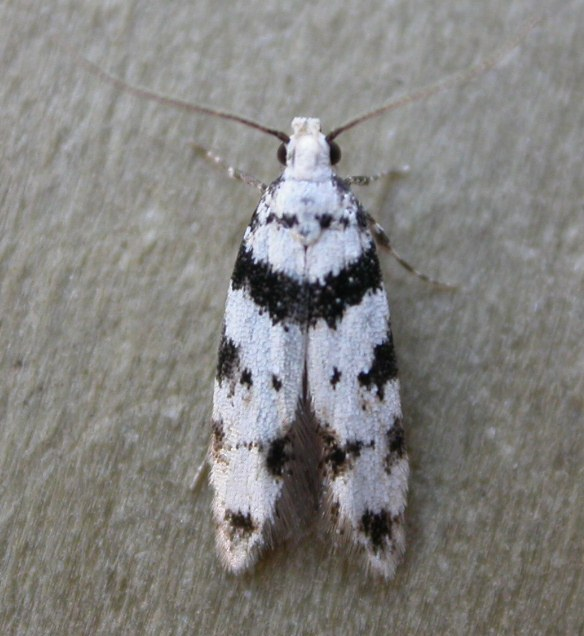

Scientific classification
- Domain: Eukaryota
- Kingdom: Animalia
- Phylum: Arthropoda
- Class: Insecta
- Order: Lepidoptera
- Family: Gelechiidae
- Genus: Pseudotelphusa
- Species: P. scalella

Binomial name
- Pseudotelphusa scalella (Scopoli, 1763)

Synonyms
- Phalaena scalella Scopoli, 1763; Tinea aleella Fabricius, 1794; Yponomeuta bicolorella Treitschke, 1832

= Pseudotelphusa scalella =

Species of moth

Pseudotelphusa scalella is a moth of the family Gelechiidae. It is found from most of Europe to the southern Ural and the Volga region. It is also found in Turkey.

The wingspan is 11–15 mm. The moths are on wing from May to June depending on the location.

The larvae feed on moss, lichen and oak trees.

A distinctive 'pied' appearance makes this Gelechiid one of the less difficult to identify. It is distributed in central and southern England, and occurs in continental Europe.

The larval stages are yet to be fully described in this country although on the continent it is believed to be associated with oak (Quercus) as well as mosses on tree-trunks.

The moths fly in May and June and are attracted to light.
