= Pseudotelphusa paracycota =

Scientific classification
- Kingdom: Animalia
- Phylum: Arthropoda
- Clade: Pancrustacea
- Class: Insecta
- Order: Lepidoptera
- Family: Gelechiidae
- Genus: Pseudotelphusa
- Species: P. paracycota

Binomial name
- Pseudotelphusa paracycota Janse, 1958

Species of moth

Pseudotelphusa paracycota is a moth of the family Gelechiidae. It is found in Zimbabwe and South Africa.
