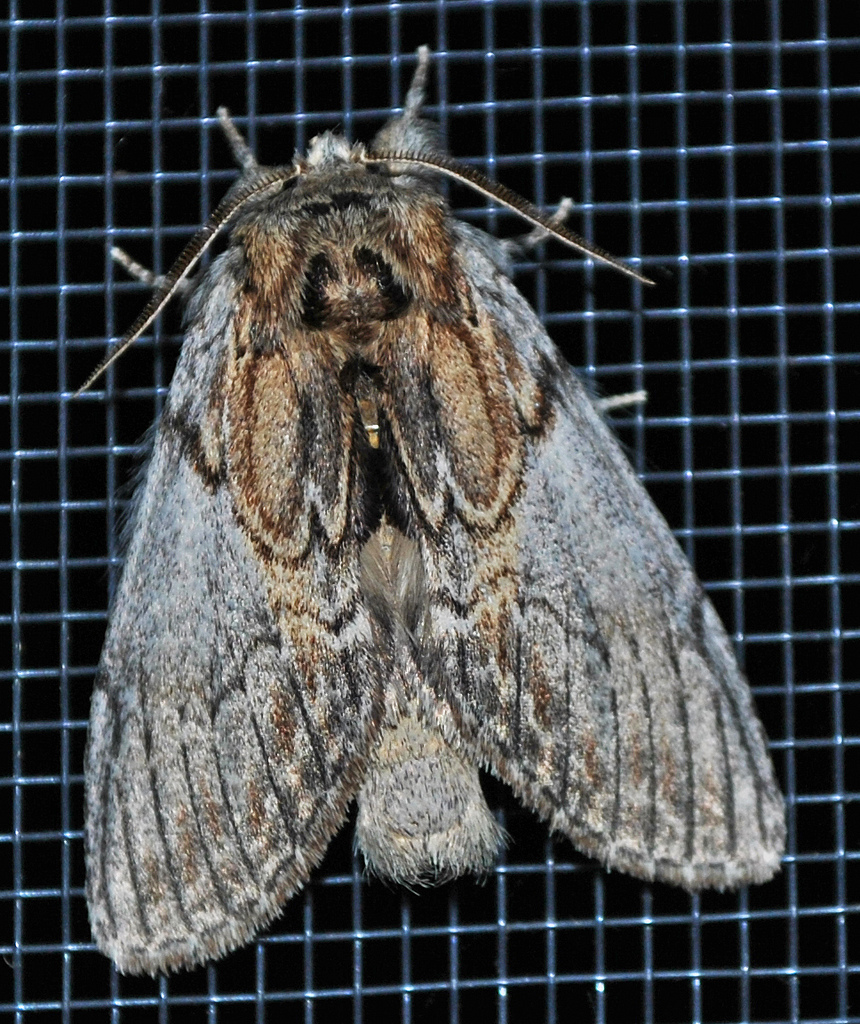

Scientific classification
- Kingdom: Animalia
- Phylum: Arthropoda
- Clade: Pancrustacea
- Class: Insecta
- Order: Lepidoptera
- Superfamily: Noctuoidea
- Family: Notodontidae
- Genus: Peridea
- Species: P. basitriens

Binomial name
- Peridea basitriens (Walker, 1855)

= Peridea basitriens =

Species of moth

Peridea basitriens, the oval-based prominent, is a species of moth in the family Notodontidae (the prominents). It was first described by Francis Walker in 1855 and it is found in North America.
