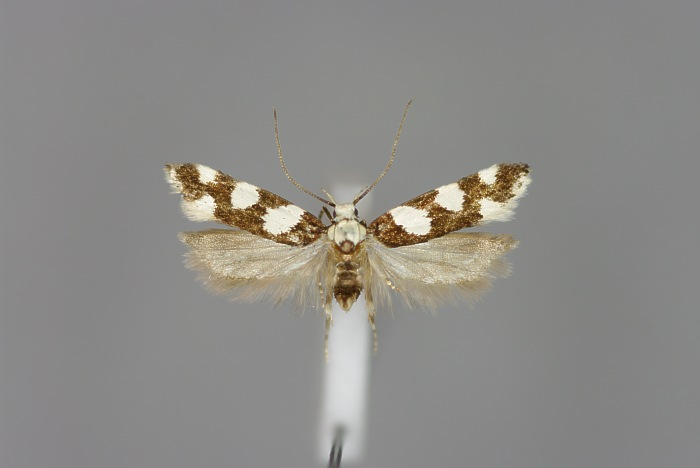

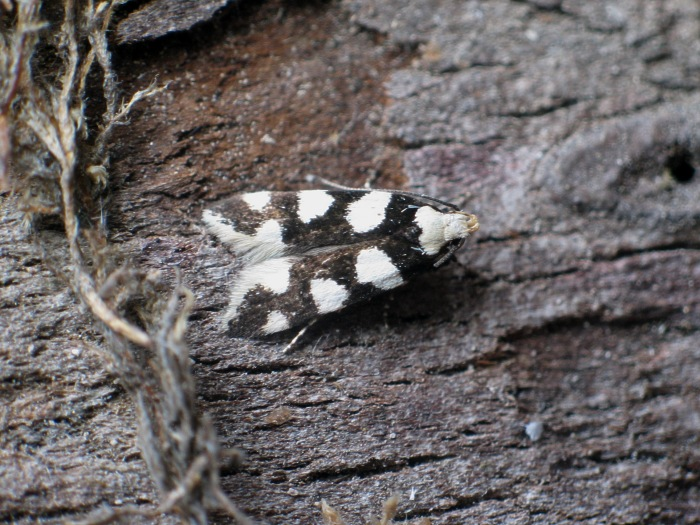

Scientific classification
- Kingdom: Animalia
- Phylum: Arthropoda
- Class: Insecta
- Order: Lepidoptera
- Family: Gelechiidae
- Genus: Pseudotelphusa
- Species: P. tessella

Binomial name
- Pseudotelphusa tessella (Linnaeus, 1758)

Synonyms
- Phalaena tessella Linnaeus, 1758; Tinea albinigrella Denis & Schiffermüller, 1775; Chionodes berberidella Hübner, [1825]; Scythropia sturmella Hübner, [1825]; Tinea funestella Geyer, [1832]; Gelechia alboquadrella Bruand, 1859; Pseudotelphusa quadrella Fabricius, 1794

= Pseudotelphusa tessella =

Species of moth

Pseudotelphusa tessella is a moth of the family Gelechiidae. It is found in Spain, France, Germany, Austria, Switzerland, the Czech Republic, Slovakia, Slovenia, Serbia and Romania.

The wingspan is 13–15 mm.

The larvae feed on Berberis vulgaris. The larvae live between spun leaves of their host plant.
