= Pseudotelphusa cycota =

Scientific classification
- Kingdom: Animalia
- Phylum: Arthropoda
- Class: Insecta
- Order: Lepidoptera
- Family: Gelechiidae
- Genus: Pseudotelphusa
- Species: P. cycota

Binomial name
- Pseudotelphusa cycota (Meyrick, 1911)

Synonyms
- Gelechia cycota Meyrick, 1911

Species of moth

Pseudotelphusa cycota is a moth of the family Gelechiidae first described by Edward Meyrick in 1911. It is found in South Africa and Zimbabwe.

The wingspan is about 10 mm. The forewings are dark fuscous somewhat mixed with blackish, irregularly sprinkled with whitish points, without defined markings. The hindwings are grey, paler towards the base.
