= Pseudotelphusa occidentella =

Scientific classification
- Kingdom: Animalia
- Phylum: Arthropoda
- Clade: Pancrustacea
- Class: Insecta
- Order: Lepidoptera
- Family: Gelechiidae
- Genus: Pseudotelphusa
- Species: P. occidentella

Binomial name
- Pseudotelphusa occidentella Huemer & Karsholt, 1999

Species of moth

Pseudotelphusa occidentella is a moth of the family Gelechiidae. It is found in southern France, Spain, Portugal and Morocco.
