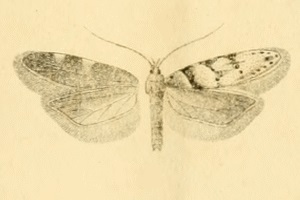

Scientific classification
- Domain: Eukaryota
- Kingdom: Animalia
- Phylum: Arthropoda
- Class: Insecta
- Order: Lepidoptera
- Family: Gelechiidae
- Genus: Pseudotelphusa
- Species: P. istrella

Binomial name
- Pseudotelphusa istrella (Mann, 1866)

Synonyms
- Gelechia istrella Mann, 1866; Gelechia decuriella Mann, 1872; Teleia trifasciella Rebel, 1916

= Pseudotelphusa istrella =

Species of moth

Pseudotelphusa istrella is a moth of the family Gelechiidae. It is found in Turkey, Italy, Slovakia, Croatia, Bosnia and Herzegovina, Romania, North Macedonia, Greece and Ukraine.

The wingspan is about 12.5 mm. The forewings are white, divided in four fields by three brown bands. The hindwings are whitish-grey.
