= Pseudotelphusa sokolovae =

Scientific classification
- Kingdom: Animalia
- Phylum: Arthropoda
- Clade: Pancrustacea
- Class: Insecta
- Order: Lepidoptera
- Family: Gelechiidae
- Genus: Pseudotelphusa
- Species: P. sokolovae

Binomial name
- Pseudotelphusa sokolovae Piskunov, 1971

Synonyms
- Klaussattleria sokolovae

Species of moth

Pseudotelphusa sokolovae is a moth of the family Gelechiidae. It is found in Tajikistan.
