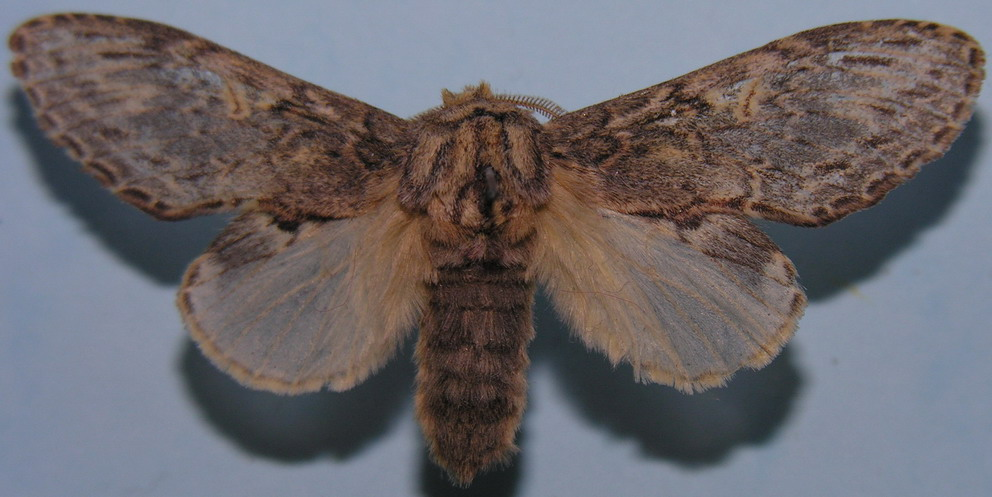
- Mounted

Scientific classification
- Kingdom: Animalia
- Phylum: Arthropoda
- Clade: Pancrustacea
- Class: Insecta
- Order: Lepidoptera
- Superfamily: Noctuoidea
- Family: Notodontidae
- Genus: Peridea
- Species: P. anceps

Binomial name
- Peridea anceps (Goeze, 1781)

= Peridea anceps =

Species of moth

Peridea anceps, the great prominent, is a moth of the family Notodontidae first described by Johann August Ephraim Goeze in 1781. It is found in central and southern Europe and North Africa.

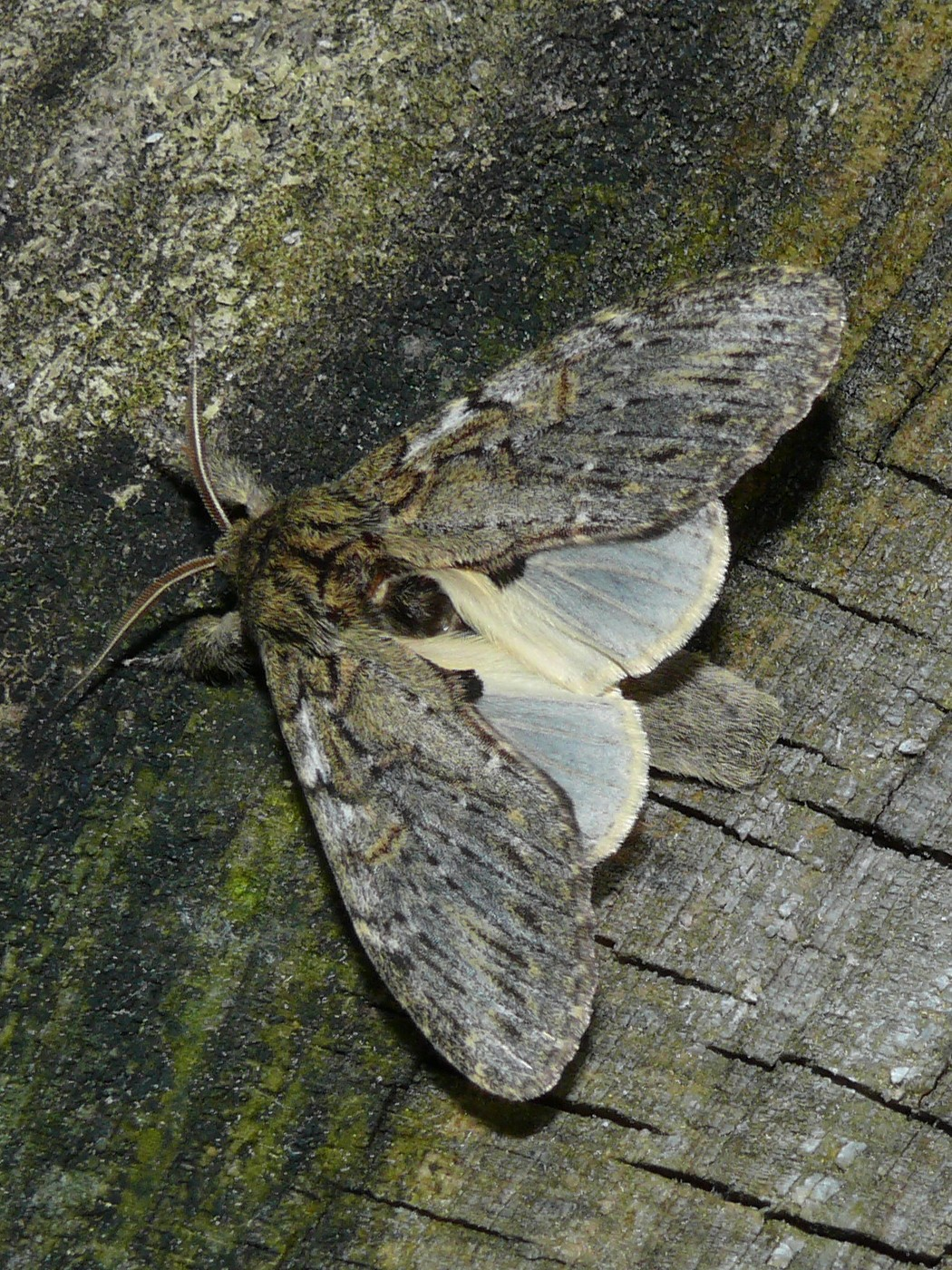

The wingspan is 50–65 mm. The antennae are almost half as long as the forewing, narrowly feathered in the male and wire-shaped in the female. The body is cylindrical, and covered with dark brownish hairs. The thorax may have slightly different drawings but the middle part is slightly darker and warmer brown than the rest. The forewing is oblong and narrow, almost oval, with a wide "tooth" of backward-pointing hairs approximately in the middle of the back edge. It is yellowish grey with four more or less distinct narrow transverse bands, the two innermost ones being dark and the two outermost light. The hindwing is yellowish-white, darker at the front edge and at the base. The larva is naked without any body outgrowths, green with short, bright oblique stripes on the side of each body joint and some, partially broken, lighter longitudinal stripes along the back. The head capsule is green with four light stripes.

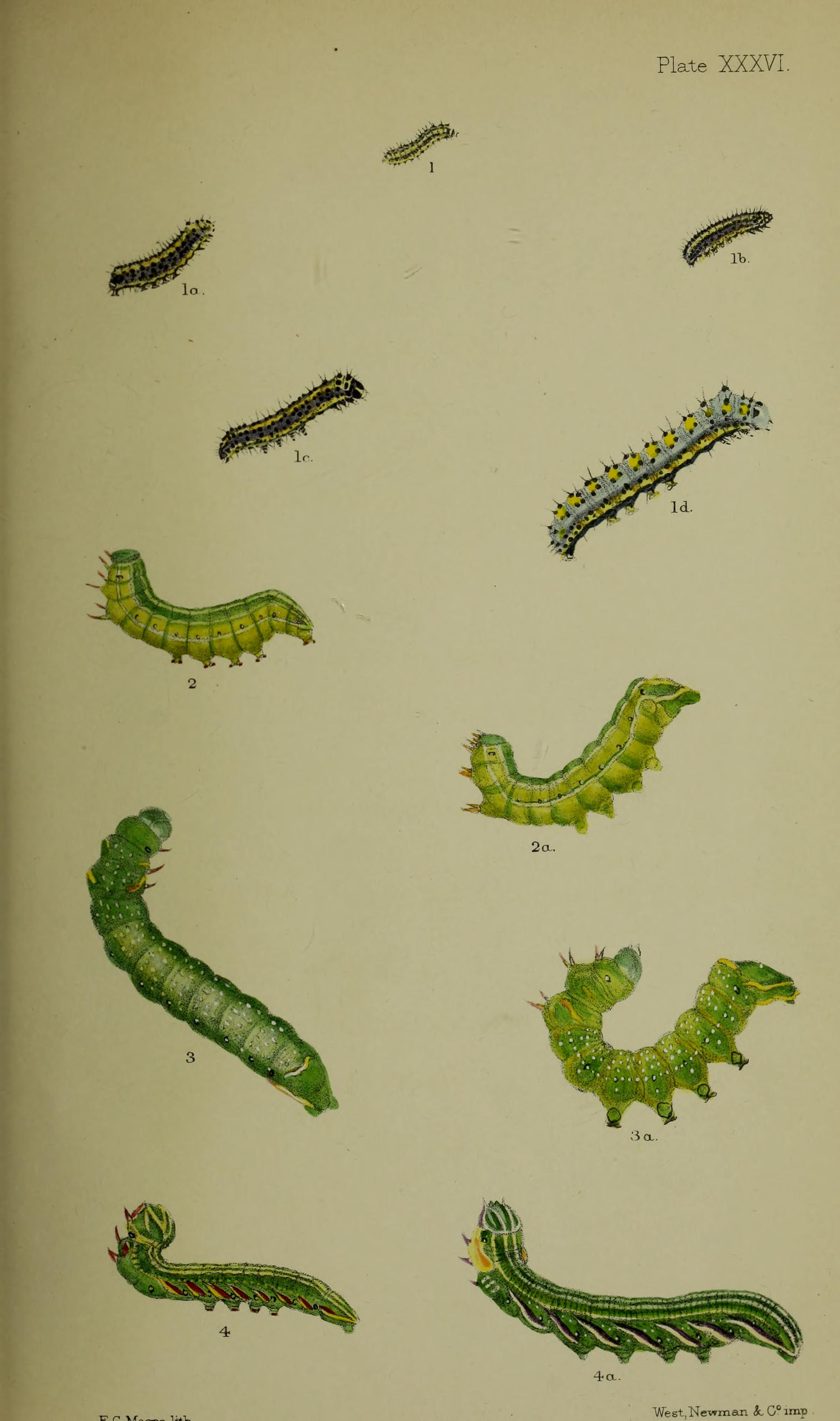
Fig.4 larvae after final moult

The moth flies from April to July depending on the location. The larvae feed on oak. If the larva is disturbed, it bends the front and hind end upwards until the front body is over the space, and cracks with the legs while shaking the front body. This surprising behavior may be enough to scare predators.
