= Pseudotelphusa basifasciella =

Scientific classification
- Kingdom: Animalia
- Phylum: Arthropoda
- Clade: Pancrustacea
- Class: Insecta
- Order: Lepidoptera
- Family: Gelechiidae
- Genus: Pseudotelphusa
- Species: P. basifasciella

Binomial name
- Pseudotelphusa basifasciella (Zeller, 1873)

Synonyms
- Gelechia (Poecilia) basifasciella Zeller, 1873

Species of moth

Pseudotelphusa basifasciella is a moth of the family Gelechiidae. It is found in North America, where it has been recorded from Alabama, Arkansas, Georgia, Illinois, Indiana, Kentucky, Louisiana, Maine, Mississippi, New Hampshire, New York, North Carolina, Oklahoma, South Carolina, Tennessee and Texas.

The wingspan is 10–15 mm. Adults are on wing in late spring and summer.
