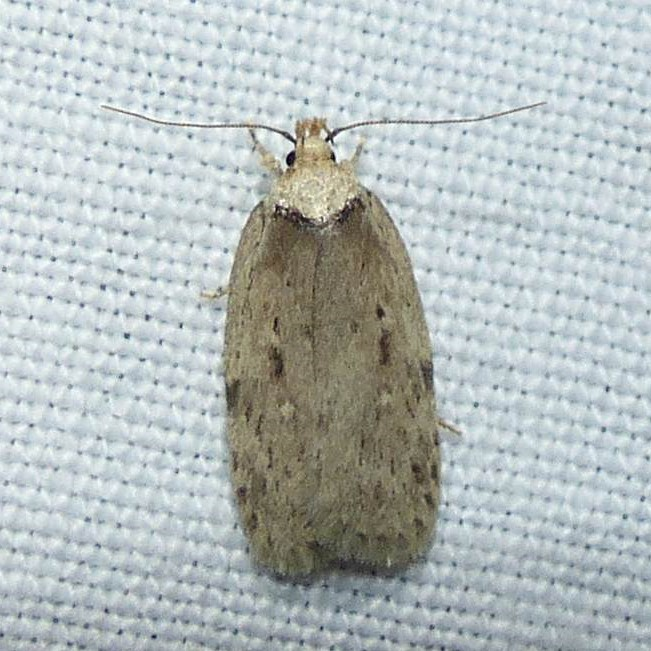

Scientific classification
- Kingdom: Animalia
- Phylum: Arthropoda
- Class: Insecta
- Order: Lepidoptera
- Family: Depressariidae
- Genus: Nites
- Species: N. betulella

Binomial name
- Nites betulella (Busck, 1902)

Synonyms
- Depressaria betulella Busck, 1902

= Nites betulella =

Species of moth

Nites betulella, the black-dotted birch leaftier moth, is a species of moth in the family Depressariidae. It was described by August Busck in 1902. It is found in North America, where it has been recorded from Nova Scotia, southern Canada, the north-eastern United States, British Columbia and Wisconsin.

== Description ==
The wingspan is about 23 mm. The forewings are ochreous, overlaid with fuscous. The base of the wings and basal part of the costa are lighter ochreous and the base of the dorsal edge is nearly white, with a small triangular deep black area above it. The hindwings are dark shining ochreous fuscous, but lighter at the base. Adults have been recorded on wing from April to October in Maine and from August to September in Alberta.

== Ecology ==
The larvae feed on Betula nigra, Betula papyrifera, Betula lutea, Corylus species, Alnus rugosa, Acer rubrum, Juglans nigra and Populus tremuloides.
