= Pseudotelphusa probata =

Scientific classification
- Kingdom: Animalia
- Phylum: Arthropoda
- Class: Insecta
- Order: Lepidoptera
- Family: Gelechiidae
- Genus: Pseudotelphusa
- Species: P. probata

Binomial name
- Pseudotelphusa probata (Meyrick, 1909)

Synonyms
- Telphusa probata Meyrick, 1909

Species of moth

Pseudotelphusa probata is a moth of the family Gelechiidae first described by Edward Meyrick in 1909. It is found in Gauteng, South Africa.

The wingspan is 11–12 mm. The forewings are dark fuscous with a broad direct white fascia before the middle, the posterior edge rather convex, followed by two small indistinct blackish spots surrounded by brown, perhaps representing the first discal and plical stigmata. The second discal stigma is represented by a similar spot with an additional spot beneath it. There is some brown suffusion and slight whitish sprinkling towards the apex. The hindwings are grey.
