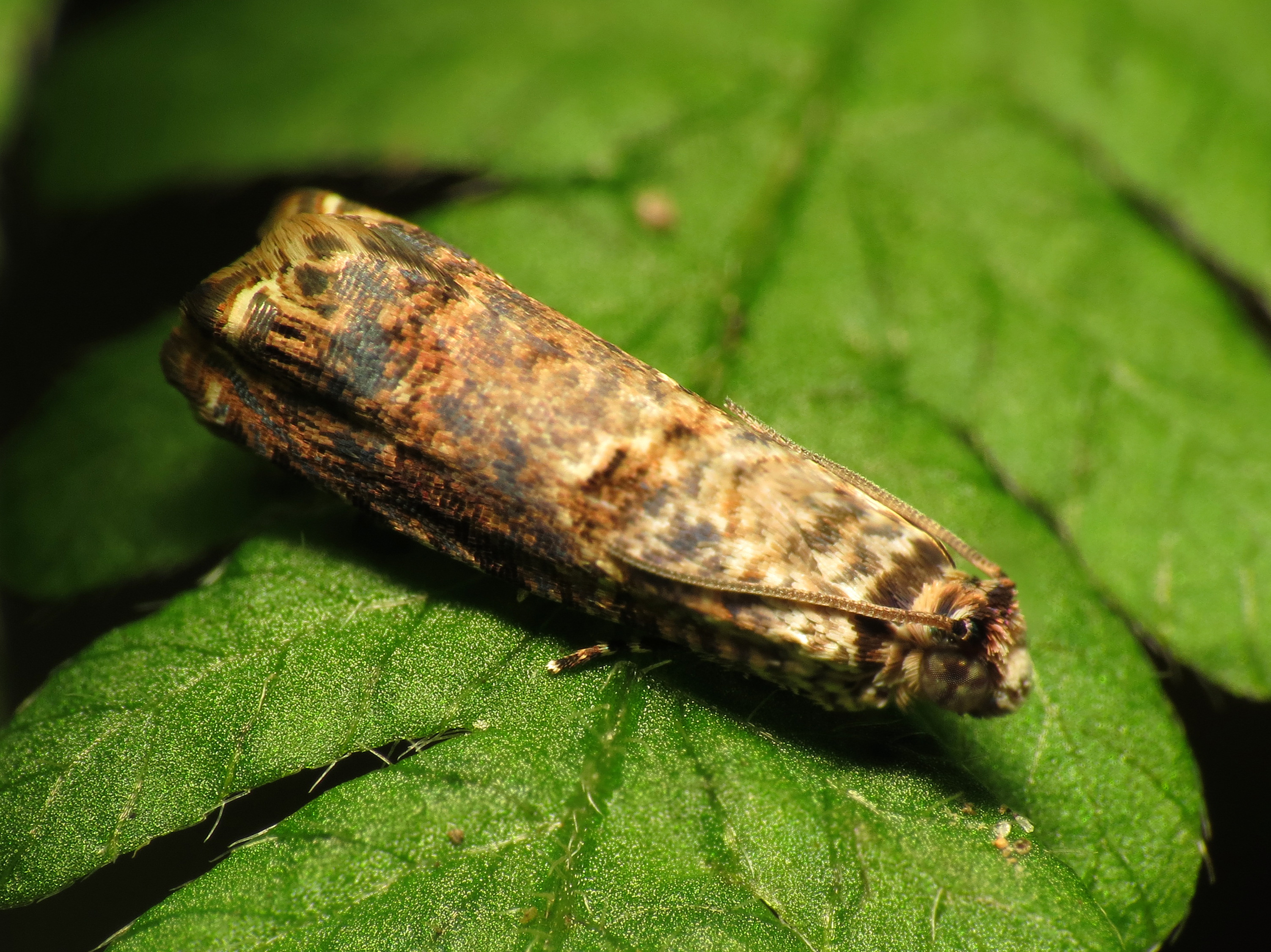

Scientific classification
- Kingdom: Animalia
- Phylum: Arthropoda
- Clade: Pancrustacea
- Class: Insecta
- Order: Lepidoptera
- Family: Depressariidae
- Genus: Nites
- Species: N. grotella

Binomial name
- Nites grotella (Robinson, 1870)

Synonyms
- Depressaria grotella Robinson, 1870; Depressaria symmochlota Meyrick, 1918

= Nites grotella =

Species of moth

Nites grotella, the hazel leaftier moth, is a moth in the family Depressariidae. It was described by Robinson in 1870. It is found in North America, where it has been recorded from Nova Scotia to New York, as well as in Manitoba and Ontario.

== Description ==
The wingspan is 20–23 mm. The forewings are greyish ochreous or light fuscous, with a broad costal streak from the base to three-fourths, suffusedly mixed with white. The base of the dorsal edge is white, edged above with blackish suffusion. The discal stigmata are white, first forming an oblique mark, the second dot like. Both are more or less edged by blackish and connected by an elongate blackish spot. There are blackish streaks between veins two and twelve, the uppermost terminating in a blackish spot on the middle of the costa. The next three are strong, interrupted by a sharply angulated whitish shade running from beyond the middle of the costa to four-fifths of the dorsum, others are slenderer, not continued beyond this shade or only by some scattered scales. There is a marginal series of irregular blackish dots round the posterior part of the costa and termen. The hindwings are whitish, slightly sprinkled pale grey posteriorly.

The larvae feed on Alnus rugosa and Betula lutea.
