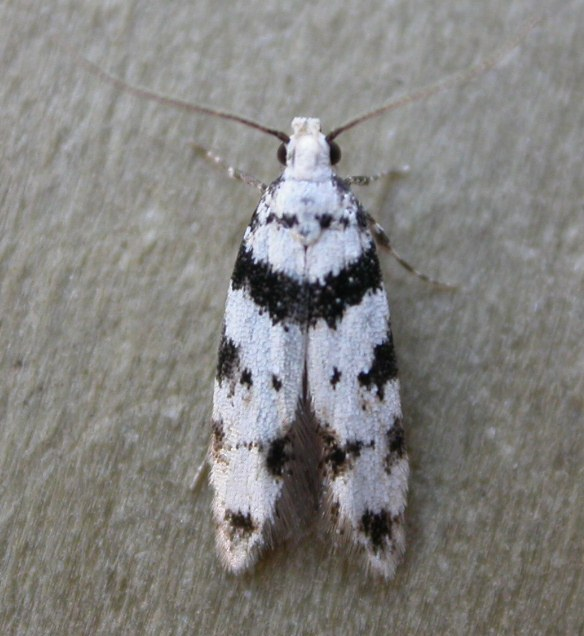
- Pseudotelphusa scalella

Scientific classification
- Domain: Eukaryota
- Kingdom: Animalia
- Phylum: Arthropoda
- Class: Insecta
- Order: Lepidoptera
- Family: Gelechiidae
- Subfamily: Gelechiinae
- Tribe: Litini
- Genus: Pseudotelphusa; Janse, 1958

Synonyms
- Klaussatleria Capuse, 1968; Klaussattleria Capuse, 1968; Sattleria Capuse, 1968

= Pseudotelphusa =

Genus of moths

Pseudotelphusa is a genus of moths in the family Gelechiidae.

== Species ==
- Pseudotelphusa acrobrunella Park, 1992
- Pseudotelphusa albisignata Janse, 1960
- Pseudotelphusa albopasta Janse, 1960
- Pseudotelphusa amelanchierella (Braun, 1930)
- Pseudotelphusa basifasciella (Zeller, 1873)
- Pseudotelphusa belangerella (Chambers, 1875)
- Pseudotelphusa betulella (Busck, 1903)
- Pseudotelphusa confixa (Meyrick, 1918)
- Pseudotelphusa cycota (Meyrick, 1911)
- Pseudotelphusa devia (Meyrick, 1913)
- Pseudotelphusa floridana Lee, 2011
- Pseudotelphusa fuscopunctella (Clemens, 1863)
- Pseudotelphusa griseotincta Janse, 1958
- Pseudotelphusa incana Hodges, 1969
- Pseudotelphusa istrella (Mann, 1866)
- Pseudotelphusa landryi Lee, 2011
- Pseudotelphusa occidentella Huemer & Karsholt, 1999
- Pseudotelphusa ontariensis Lee, 2011
- Pseudotelphusa oxychasta (Meyrick, 1929)
- Pseudotelphusa palliderosacella (Chambers, 1878)
- Pseudotelphusa paracycota Janse, 1958
- Pseudotelphusa paripunctella (Thunberg, 1794)
- Pseudotelphusa probata (Meyrick, 1909)
- Pseudotelphusa quercinigracella (Chambers, 1872)
- Pseudotelphusa scalella (Scopoli, 1763)
- Pseudotelphusa sokolovae Piskunov, 1971
- Pseudotelphusa tessella (Linnaeus, 1758)
- Pseudotelphusa tornimacula Janse, 1958
- Pseudotelphusa trinephela (Meyrick, 1929)

== Former species ==
- Pseudotelphusa decuriella
- Pseudotelphusa fugitivella
