= Pseudotelphusa landryi =

Scientific classification
- Domain: Eukaryota
- Kingdom: Animalia
- Phylum: Arthropoda
- Class: Insecta
- Order: Lepidoptera
- Family: Gelechiidae
- Genus: Pseudotelphusa
- Species: P. landryi

Binomial name
- Pseudotelphusa landryi Lee, 2011

Species of moth

Pseudotelphusa landryi is a moth of the family Gelechiidae. It is found in North America, where it has been recorded from Quebec and West Virginia.
