= Pseudotelphusa oxychasta =

Scientific classification
- Kingdom: Animalia
- Phylum: Arthropoda
- Class: Insecta
- Order: Lepidoptera
- Family: Gelechiidae
- Genus: Pseudotelphusa
- Species: P. oxychasta

Binomial name
- Pseudotelphusa oxychasta (Meyrick, 1929)

Synonyms
- Telphusa oxychasta Meyrick, 1929

Species of moth

Pseudotelphusa oxychasta is a moth of the family Gelechiidae. It is found in Namibia, South Africa and Zimbabwe.

The wingspan is about 17 mm.
