= Nites atrocapitella =

Scientific classification
- Domain: Eukaryota
- Kingdom: Animalia
- Phylum: Arthropoda
- Class: Insecta
- Order: Lepidoptera
- Family: Depressariidae
- Genus: Nites
- Species: N. atrocapitella

Binomial name
- Nites atrocapitella (McDunnough, 1944)

Synonyms
- Depressaria atrocapitella McDunnough, 1944

Species of moth

Nites atrocapitella is a moth in the family Depressariidae. It was described by James Halliday McDunnough in 1944. It is found in North America, where it has been recorded from Ontario, Manitoba, Maine and Connecticut.

Adults have been recorded on wing in April.

The larvae feed on Corylus species.
