= Pseudotelphusa belangerella =

Scientific classification
- Kingdom: Animalia
- Phylum: Arthropoda
- Clade: Pancrustacea
- Class: Insecta
- Order: Lepidoptera
- Family: Gelechiidae
- Genus: Pseudotelphusa
- Species: P. belangerella

Binomial name
- Pseudotelphusa belangerella (Chambers, 1875)

Synonyms
- Gelechia belangerella Chambers, 1875; Gelechia (Teleia) oronella Walsingham, 1883

Species of moth

Pseudotelphusa belangerella is a moth of the family Gelechiidae. It is found in North America, where it has been recorded from Alberta, Maine and Kentucky.

The wingspan is about 15 mm. The forewings are greyish white with a patch at the base of the costa pointing downwards parallel to the fold, a sometimes reduplicated streak along the middle of the fold, an outwardly oblique line of spots from before the middle of the costa, beyond which are two dots at the end of the cell, all brownish fuscous. The wing is speckled and smeared, especially above and below the fold and on the apical portion, with dilute brownish fuscous, and there is a spot on the beginning of the costal cilia, preceded by a smaller one of the same colour, others less conspicuous around the apical margin. The hindwings are greyish.
