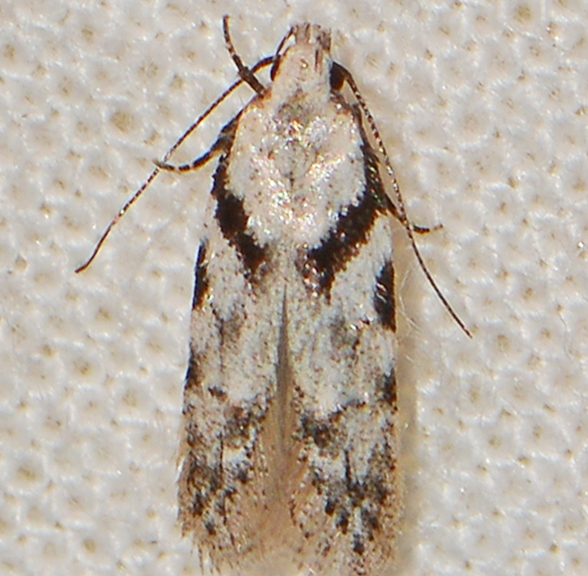

Scientific classification
- Kingdom: Animalia
- Phylum: Arthropoda
- Clade: Pancrustacea
- Class: Insecta
- Order: Lepidoptera
- Family: Gelechiidae
- Genus: Pseudotelphusa
- Species: P. palliderosacella

Binomial name
- Pseudotelphusa palliderosacella (Chambers, 1878)

Synonyms
- Gelechia (Ergatis) palliderosacella Chambers, 1878

= Pseudotelphusa palliderosacella =

Species of moth

Pseudotelphusa palliderosacella is a moth of the family Gelechiidae. It is found in North America, where it has been recorded from Alabama, Illinois, Kentucky, Maine, Maryland, Ohio, Oklahoma, Texas and West Virginia.

The forewings are pale greyish, dusted with dark grey, and very faintly tinted with roseate. The base of the costal margin, an oblique fascia behind it, and a little further back, but still before the middle, an oblique costal band, extending to the fold, are all blackish-brown. Behind the last of these streaks, in the middle of the wing, is a short, blackish dash surrounded by a hoary or whitish annulus. Behind the middle is a costal, dark grey spot, opposite to which is a still smaller dorsal one, and opposite to the space between them is another blackish dash. The portions of the wing above and below that are slightly dusted, while behind it the apical part of the wing is more densely dusted with brownish scales.
