= Pseudotelphusa trinephela =

Scientific classification
- Kingdom: Animalia
- Phylum: Arthropoda
- Class: Insecta
- Order: Lepidoptera
- Family: Gelechiidae
- Genus: Pseudotelphusa
- Species: P. trinephela

Binomial name
- Pseudotelphusa trinephela (Meyrick, 1929)

Synonyms
- Telphusa trinephela Meyrick, 1929

Species of moth

Pseudotelphusa trinephela is a moth of the family Gelechiidae. It is found in Zimbabwe.

The wingspan is about 10 mm.
