= Pseudotelphusa devia =

Scientific classification
- Kingdom: Animalia
- Phylum: Arthropoda
- Class: Insecta
- Order: Lepidoptera
- Family: Gelechiidae
- Genus: Pseudotelphusa
- Species: P. devia

Binomial name
- Pseudotelphusa devia (Meyrick, 1913)

Synonyms
- Gelechia devia Meyrick, 1913

Species of moth

Pseudotelphusa devia is a moth of the family Gelechiidae first described by Edward Meyrick in 1913. It is found in South Africa.

The wingspan is about 13 mm. The forewings are white, on the dorsal half irrorated (sprinkled) with fuscous, on the costal half with streaks of fuscous or dark fuscous irroration on the veins. A rather irregular narrow black streak runs from the base of the costa very obliquely to the disc and then slightly sinuate through the middle of the disc to the apex, sharply interrupted at two-thirds, with black dots above and below this interruption. There is a short fine black dash at the base beneath this, one on the fold in the middle connected with its lower edge, and one sometimes longer towards the costa before the middle. A series of black marks is found around the posterior part of the costa and termen. The hindwings are light grey, paler towards the base.
