= Pseudotelphusa fuscopunctella =

Scientific classification
- Kingdom: Animalia
- Phylum: Arthropoda
- Clade: Pancrustacea
- Class: Insecta
- Order: Lepidoptera
- Family: Gelechiidae
- Genus: Pseudotelphusa
- Species: P. fuscopunctella

Binomial name
- Pseudotelphusa fuscopunctella (Clemens, 1863)

Synonyms
- Gelechia fuscopunctella Clemens, 1863

Species of moth

Pseudotelphusa fuscopunctella is a moth of the family Gelechiidae. It is found in North America, where it has been recorded from Arkansas, Florida, Georgia, Illinois, Indiana, Kentucky, Maine, Mississippi, Pennsylvania, New Jersey, South Carolina and West Virginia.

The forewings are dark grey, with three dark fuscous spots along the costa, a small one near the base, beneath which obliquely are two small ones of the same hue, one on each side of the fold, one at the beginning of the costal cilia, sometimes indistinct, beneath which, in the middle of the wing, are two dark fuscous dots, one placed above the other. Midway between the two costal spots is a larger costal spot, with a dot of the same hue beneath it in the disc. The largest costal spot and that nearest the base of the wing, are slightly margined beneath with pale brown. The hindmargin, at the base of the cilia, has three or four dark fuscous dots. At the basal end of the fold is a dark fuscous dot and another at the extreme base of the costa.
