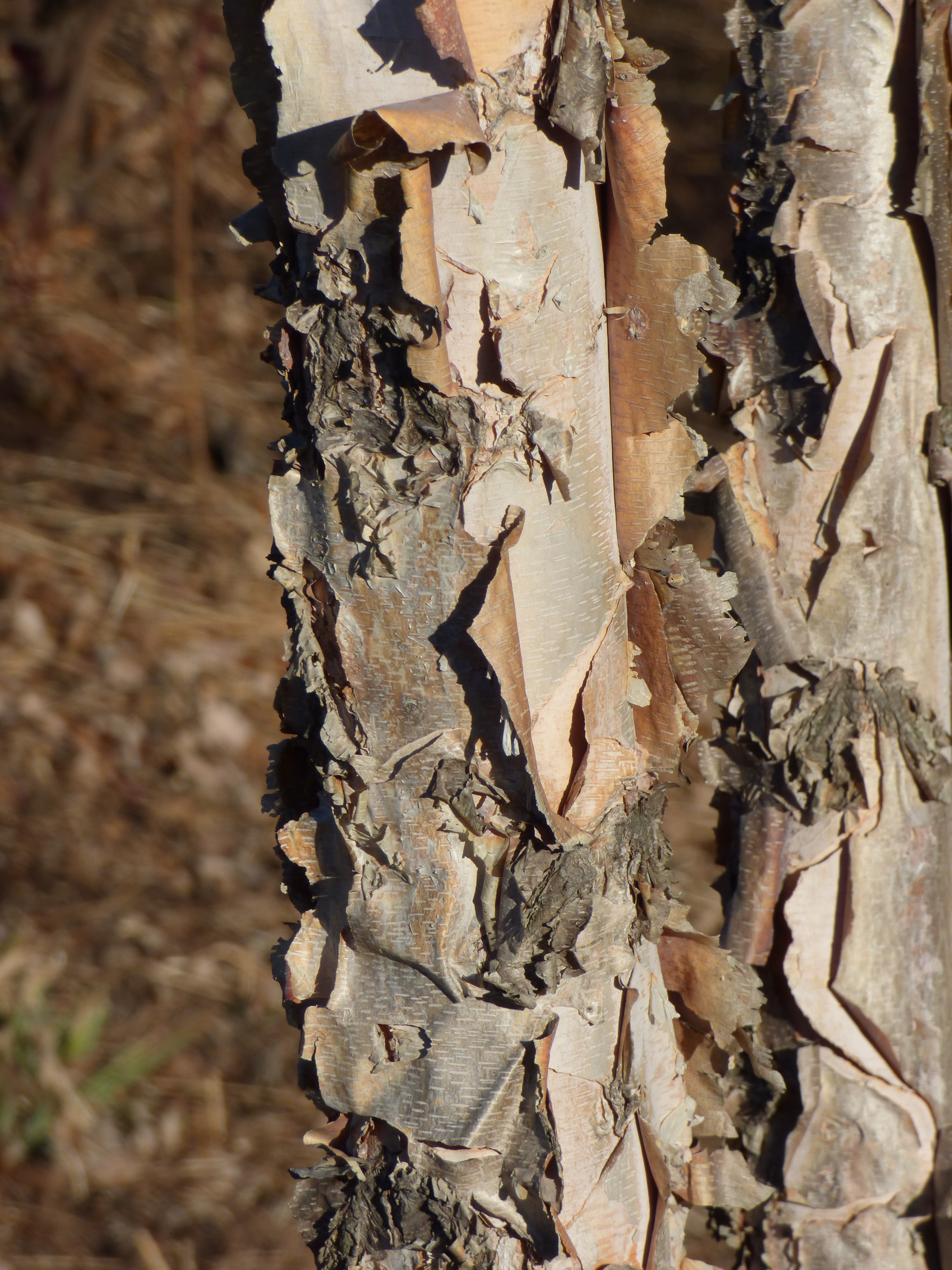
- The bark of a young river birch

Conservation status
- Least Concern (IUCN 3.1)

Scientific classification
- Kingdom: Plantae
- Clade: Tracheophytes
- Clade: Angiosperms
- Clade: Eudicots
- Clade: Rosids
- Order: Fagales
- Family: Betulaceae
- Genus: Betula
- Subgenus: Betula subg. Neurobetula
- Species: B. nigra

Binomial name
- Betula nigra L.
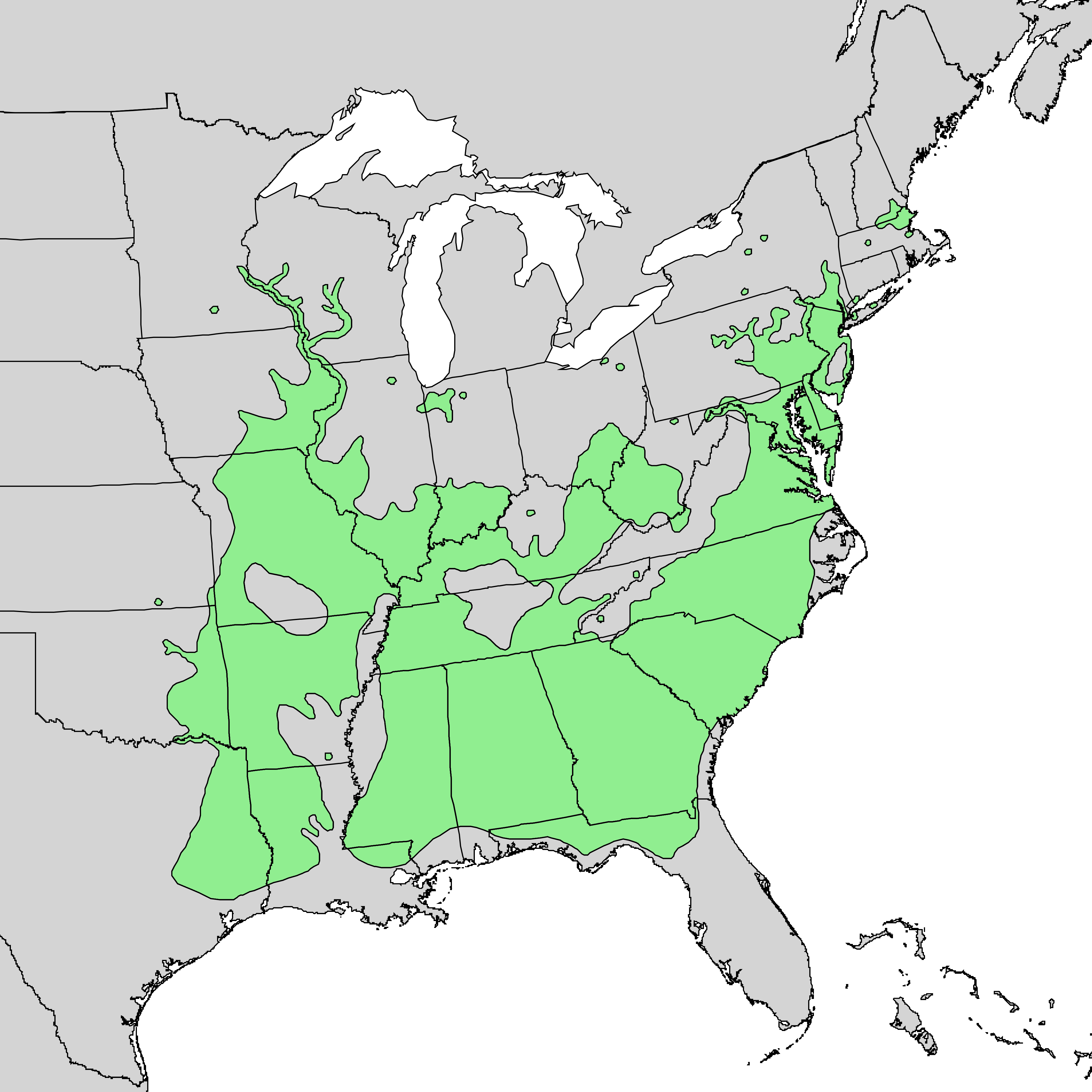
- Natural range of Betula nigra

Synonyms
- Betula americana Buc'hoz, nom. nud.; Betula lanulosa Michx.; Betula nigra var. parvifolia Regel; Betula nigra pendula Paul, nom. nud.; Betula rubra F.Michx., nom. illeg. superfl.; Betula rupestris Raf.

= Betula nigra =

Species of birch

Betula nigra, the black birch, river birch or water birch, is a species of birch native to the Eastern United States from New Hampshire west to southern Minnesota, and south to northern Florida and west to Texas. It is one of the few heat-tolerant birches in a family of mostly cold-weather trees which do not thrive in USDA Zone 6 and up. B. nigra commonly occurs in floodplains and swamps.

== Description ==
Betula nigra is a deciduous tree growing to 25–30 meters (80–100 ft) with a trunk 50 to 150 centimeters (20 to 60 in) in diameter. The base of the tree is often divided into multiple slender trunks.

Bark

Bark characteristics of the river birch differ during its youth stage, maturation, and old growth. The bark of a young river birch can vary from having a salmon-pink to brown-gray tint and can be described as having loose layers of curling, paper thin scales. As the tree matures, the salmon-pink color is exchanged for a reddish-brown with a dark grey base color. The scales on a mature tree lack the loose curling and are closely pressed into thick, irregular plates. These scales are slightly separated from the trunk and can shift outward to the side. Once the river birch ages past maturity, the scales become thicker towards the base of the trunk and are divided in deep furrows.

Leaves and fruit

The twigs are glabrous or thinly hairy. There is an absence of terminal buds, and lateral buds often have a hook at the tip of the bud, which differs from other species in the family Betulaceae. The leaves are alternate, ovate, 4–8 centimeters (1 1/2–3 1/4 in) long and 3–6 centimeters (1 1/4–2 1/4 in) broad, with a serrated margin and five to twelve pairs of veins. The upper surface of the leaf is dark green in color, while the underside can be described as having a light yellow-green color. The leaves turn yellow in Autumn. The flowers are wind-pollinated catkins 3–6 centimeters (1 1/4–2 1/4 in) long, the male catkins pendulous, the female catkins erect. The fruit is unusual among birches in maturing in late spring; it is composed of numerous tiny winged seeds packed between the catkin bracts.

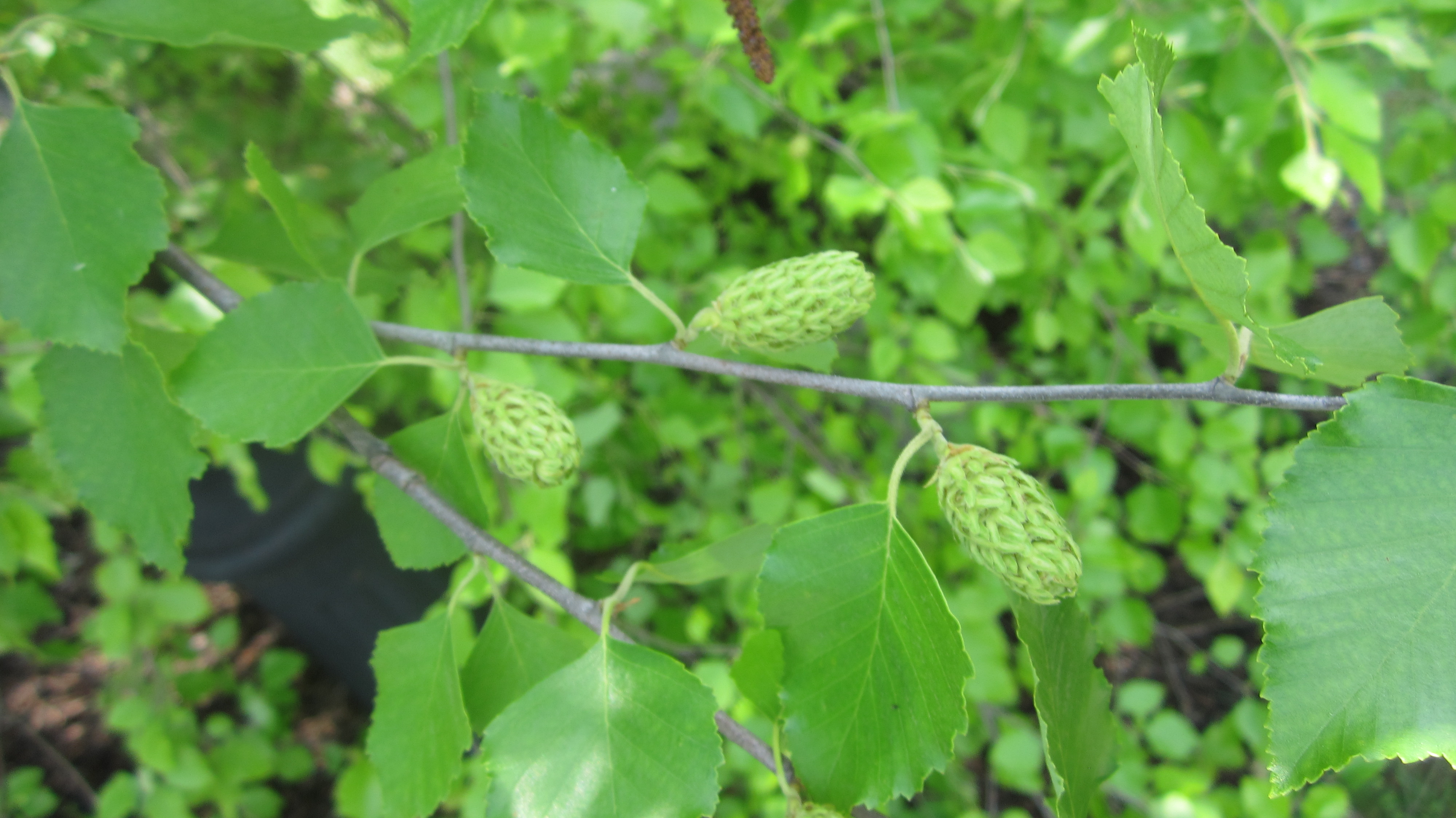
River birch leaves & seeds

== Taxonomy ==
Betula nigra is a tree that classified in the family Betulaceae, which is commonly known as the Birch or Alder Family. This family comprises six genera (Alnus, Betula, Carpinus, Corylus, Ostrya, and Ostryopsis) and includes alders, birches, hornbeams, and hazelnuts. Species within this family, along with Betula nigra, are shrubs or trees that grow along stream sides or in poorly drained soils throughout the Northern Hemisphere. Betulaceae is included within the order Fagales, which branches from the Rosid clade.

== Habitat and range ==
The river birch is often found in low-elevation regions from as north as New Hampshire to as south as northern Florida. It can be found extending west to Kansas and east to the coast where proper habitat conditions occur. As its name depicts, this birch is found along stream-sides. It can also be a prominent species found in forested wetland communities and in areas containing moist soil, such as floodplains. States include: Alabama, Arkansas, Connecticut, Delaware, Florida, Georgia, Illinois, Indiana, Iowa, Kansas, Kentucky, Louisiana, Maryland, Massachusetts, Mississippi, Missouri, New Hampshire, New Jersey, New York, North Carolina, Ohio, Oklahoma, Pennsylvania, South Carolina, Tennessee, Texas, Virginia, West Virginia, and Wisconsin.

River birch is best placed in USDA hardiness zones 4–9.

== Conservation status in the United States ==
It is listed as threatened in New Hampshire.

== Ecology ==
In states in which mining is prevalent, the river birch is often used for reclamation and erosion control, as it is well suited for soils that are too acidic for other species of hardwoods. In West Virginia, they have been found to establish within mine refuse sites after being blown from neighboring areas.

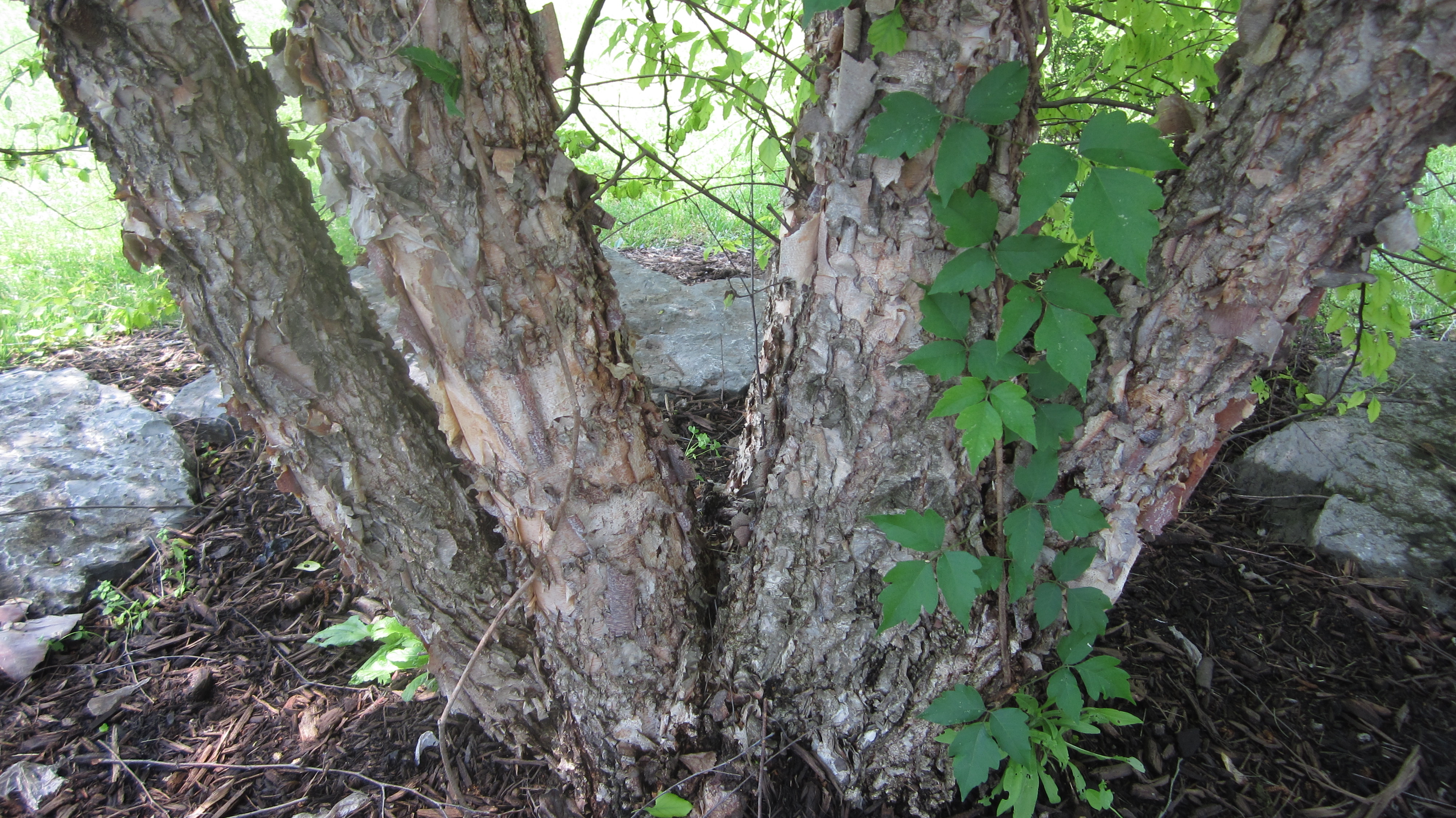
Trunk of a river birch

As the species occurs predominately in flood plains and along stream banks, it is described as being moderately tolerant of flooding. Saplings were observed to survive up to 30 days of continuous flooding in some regions. While the species is tolerant of excessive water, it is intolerant of shade. Seeds will not germinate without a large amount of direct sunlight.

This species is utilized by many local bird species, such as waterfowl, ruffed grouse, and wild turkey. Many waterfowl use the cover for nesting sites, while the ruffed grouse and wild turkey use the seeds as a food source. Deer have been known to graze on saplings or reachable branches. It is a larval host for over fifteen moth species, including Acronicta betulae, Acrobasis betulivorella, Bucculatrix coronatella, Nemoria bistriaria, Nites betulella, Orgyia leucostigma, and Pseudotelphusa betulella.

== Germination ==
Seeds are typically produced annually. Seasonal development begins in the fall as male catkins begin to form and mature. The emergence of female catkins corresponds with the return of leaves around early spring. Male and female fruit matures during the spring season or in the early summer months.

Once mature, the seeds are predominantly spread by wind or water from neighboring stream channels. Seeds spread by water are generally more successful as the moist banks of stream channels, where the seeds are deposited, are favorable for germination and sturdy establishment. Successful germination often occurs in large numbers along sandbars, where alluvial soil is present.

== Cultivation and uses ==
While its native habitat is wet ground, it will grow on higher land, and its bark is quite distinctive, making it a favored ornamental tree for landscape use. A number of cultivars with much whiter bark than the normal wild type have been selected for garden planting, including 'Heritage' and 'Dura Heat'; these are notable as the only white-barked birches resistant to the bronze birch borer (Agrilus anxius) in warm areas of the southeastern United States of America.

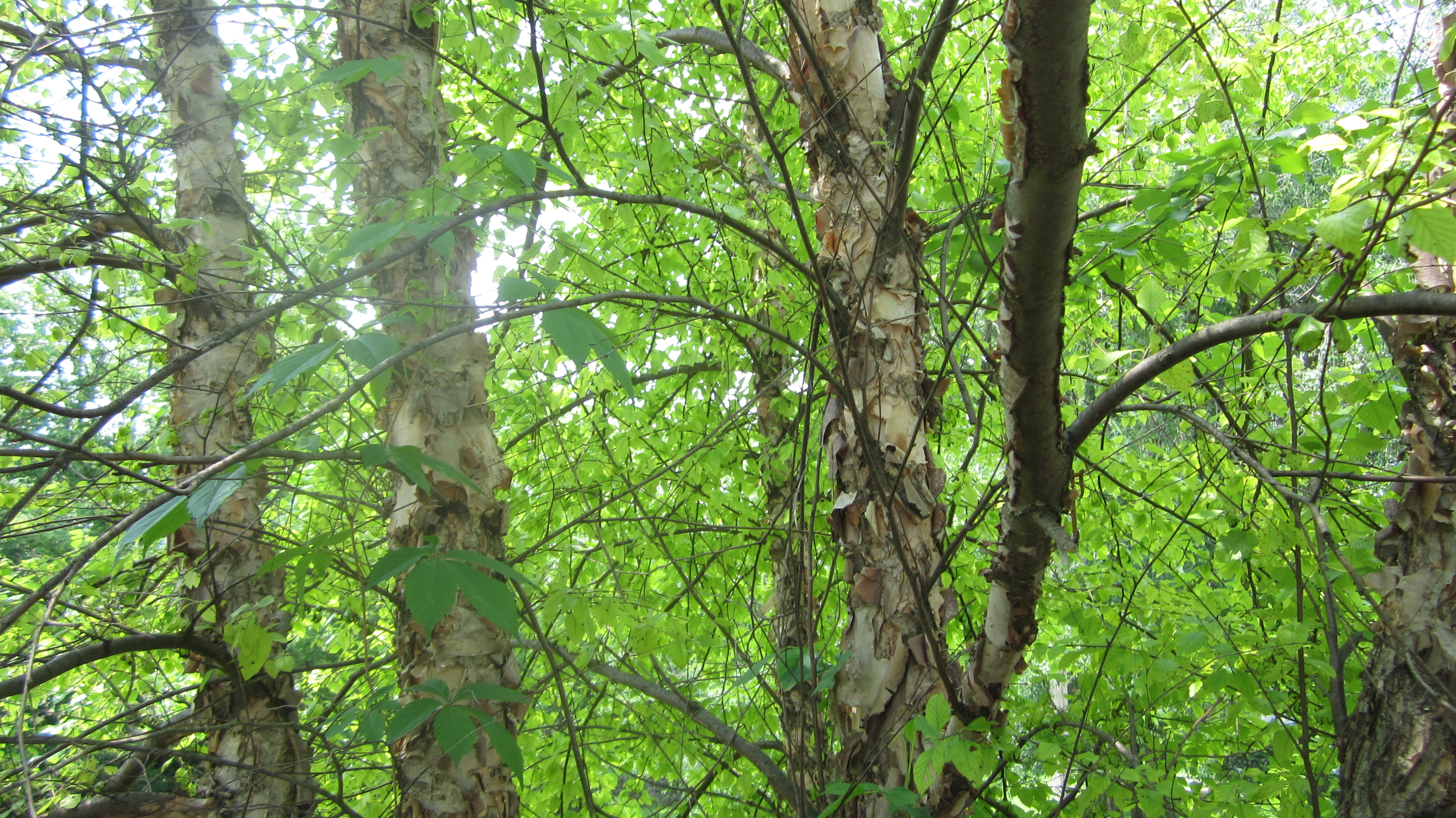
Middle of the tree

Native Americans used the boiled sap as a sweetener similar to maple syrup, and the inner bark as a survival food. The river birch is not typically used in the commercial lumber industry, due to knotting, but its strong, closely grained wood is sometimes used for local furniture, woodenware, and fuel.

== Essential oils ==
The essential oils derived from leaves, inner bark, and buds of B. nigra are mostly composed of eugenol, linalool, palmitic acid, and heptacosane with many more compounds in smaller concentrations. The combined essential oils are phytotoxic to lettuce (Lactuca sativa) and perennial ryegrass (Lolium perenne) seedlings. They have also demonstrated insecticidal, nematicidal, and antibacterial properties.

== Gallery ==
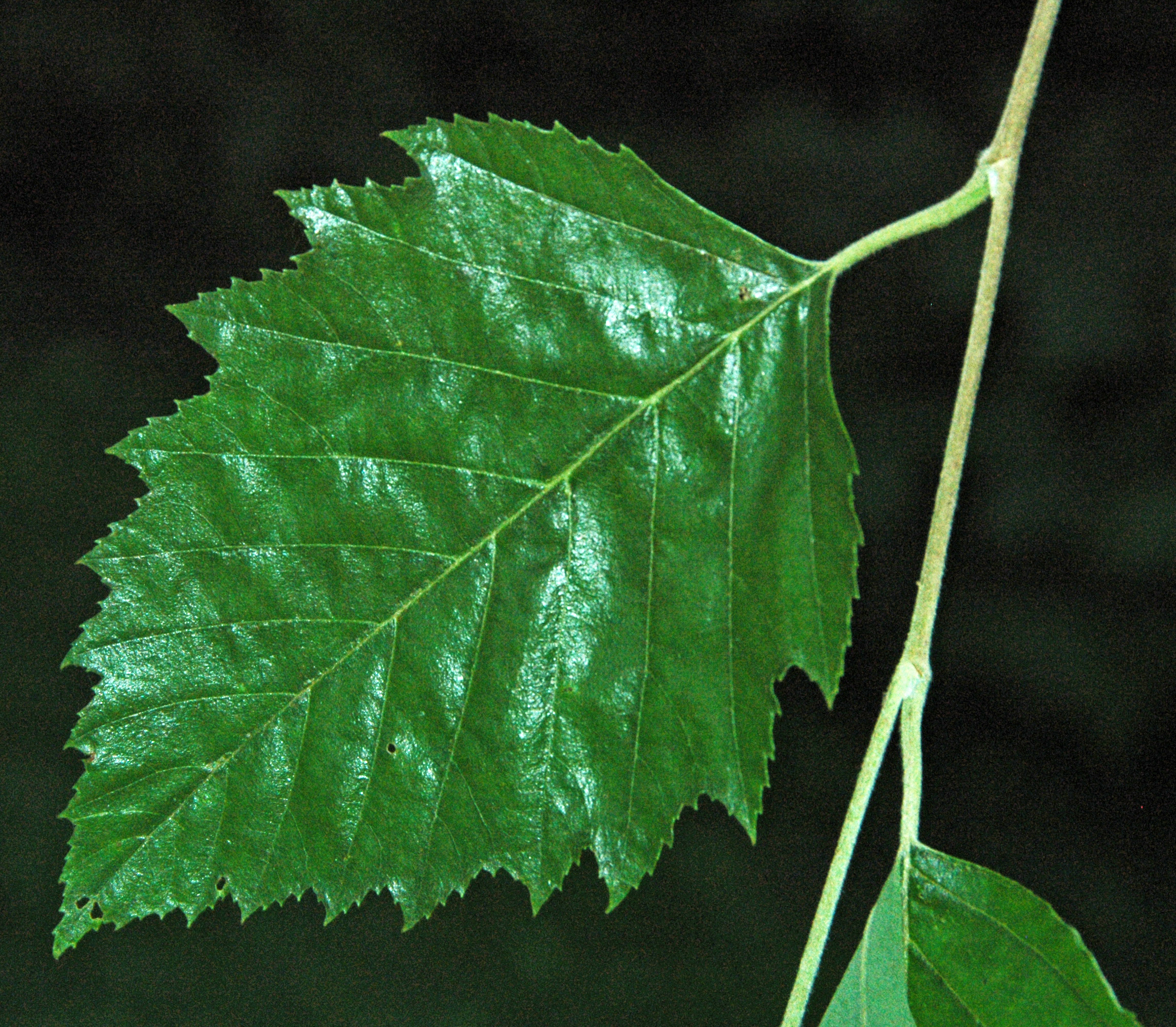
River birch leaf.

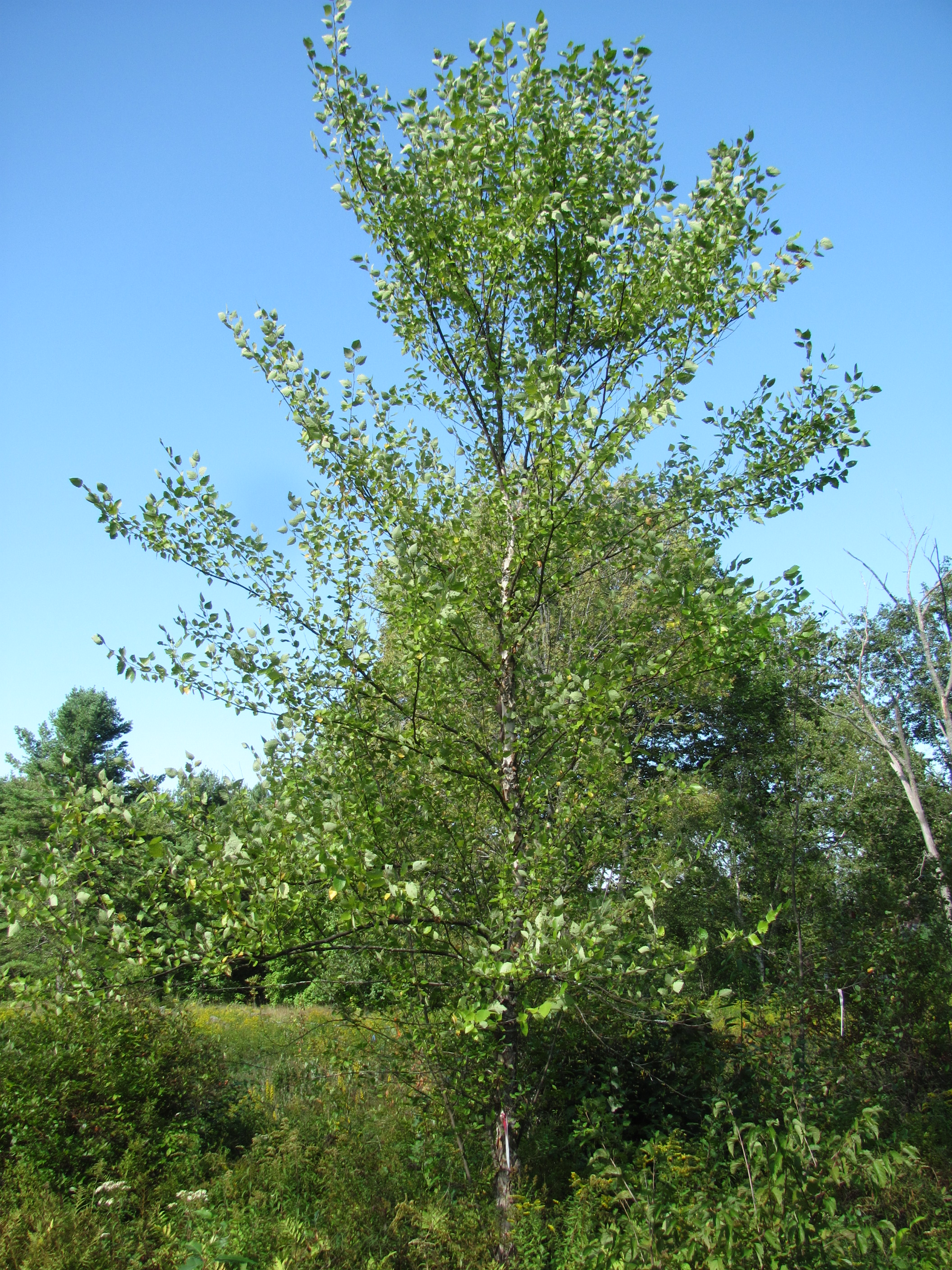
At Skyfields Arboretum

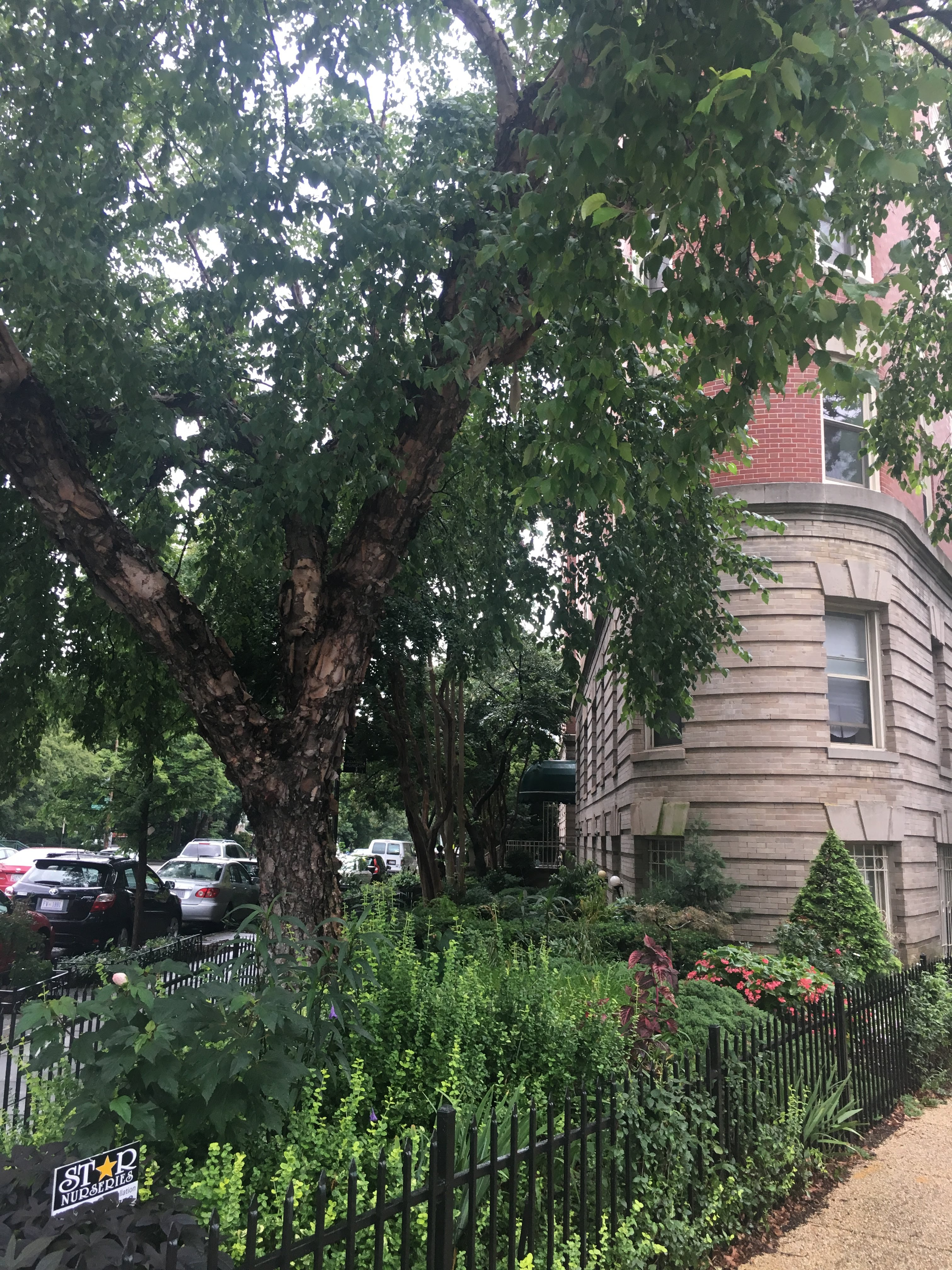
An ornamental river birch planting in Washington, DC

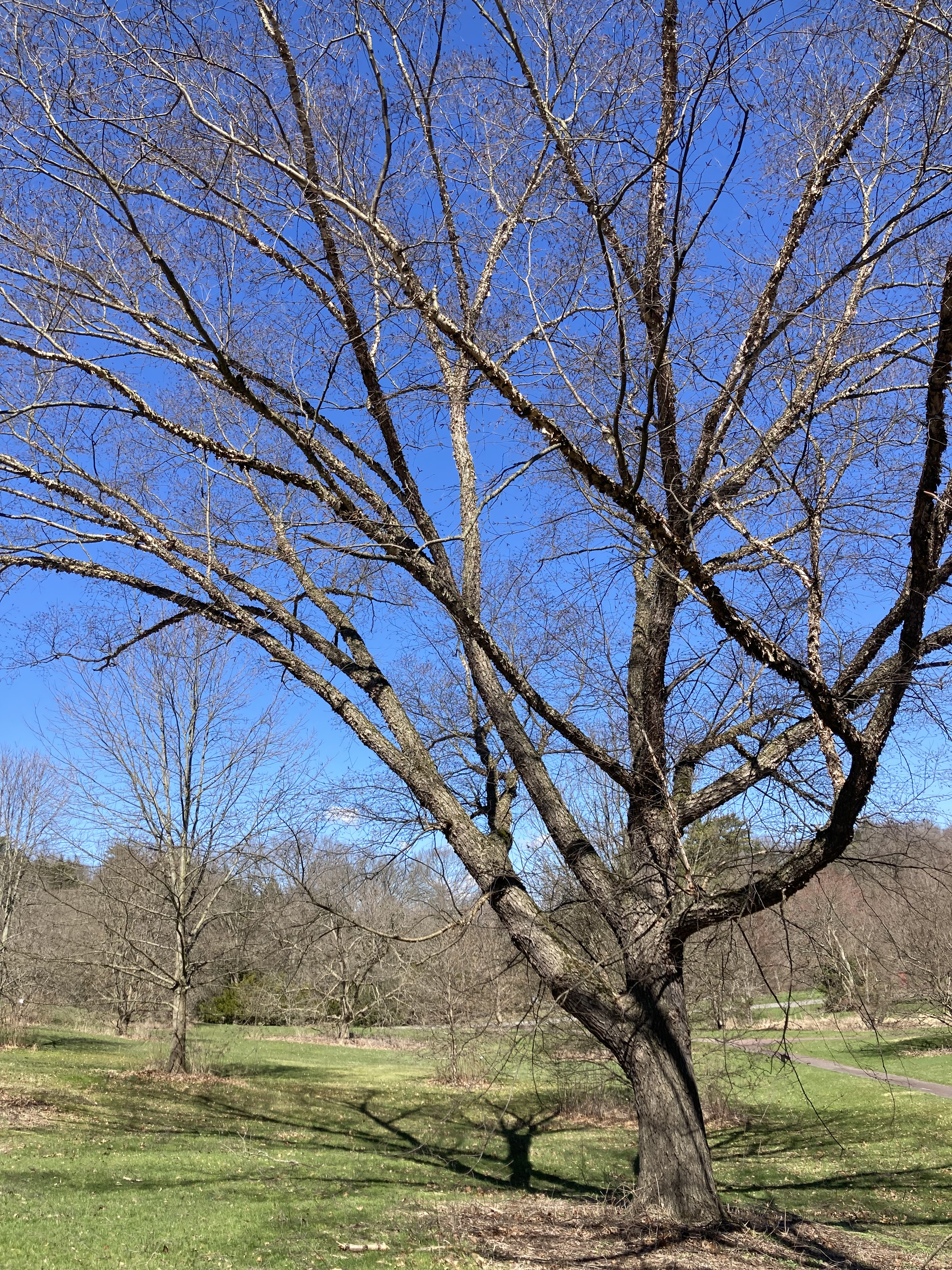
Mature river birch specimen at the Cornell Botanic Gardens.

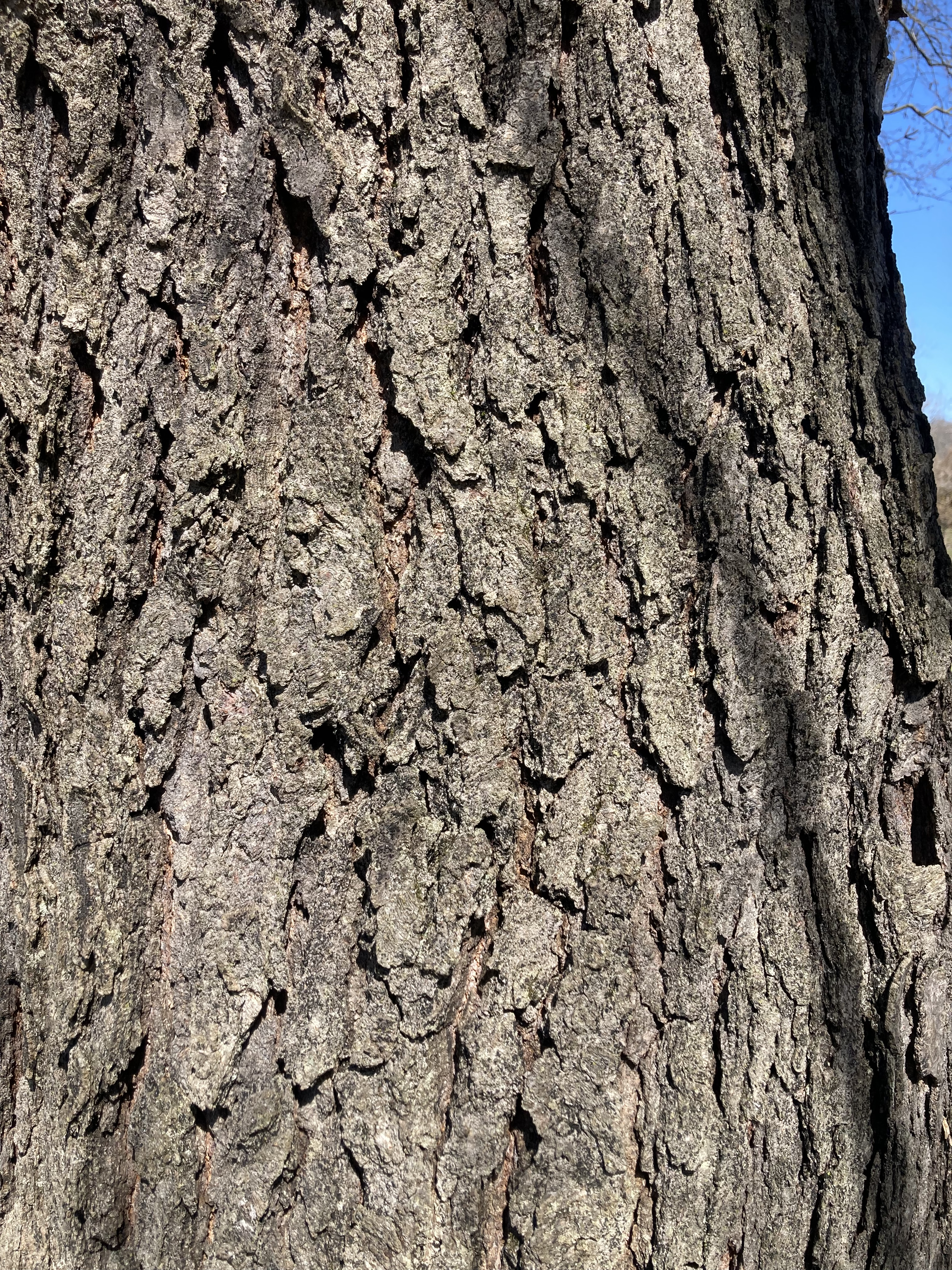
Close-up of mature river birch bark.

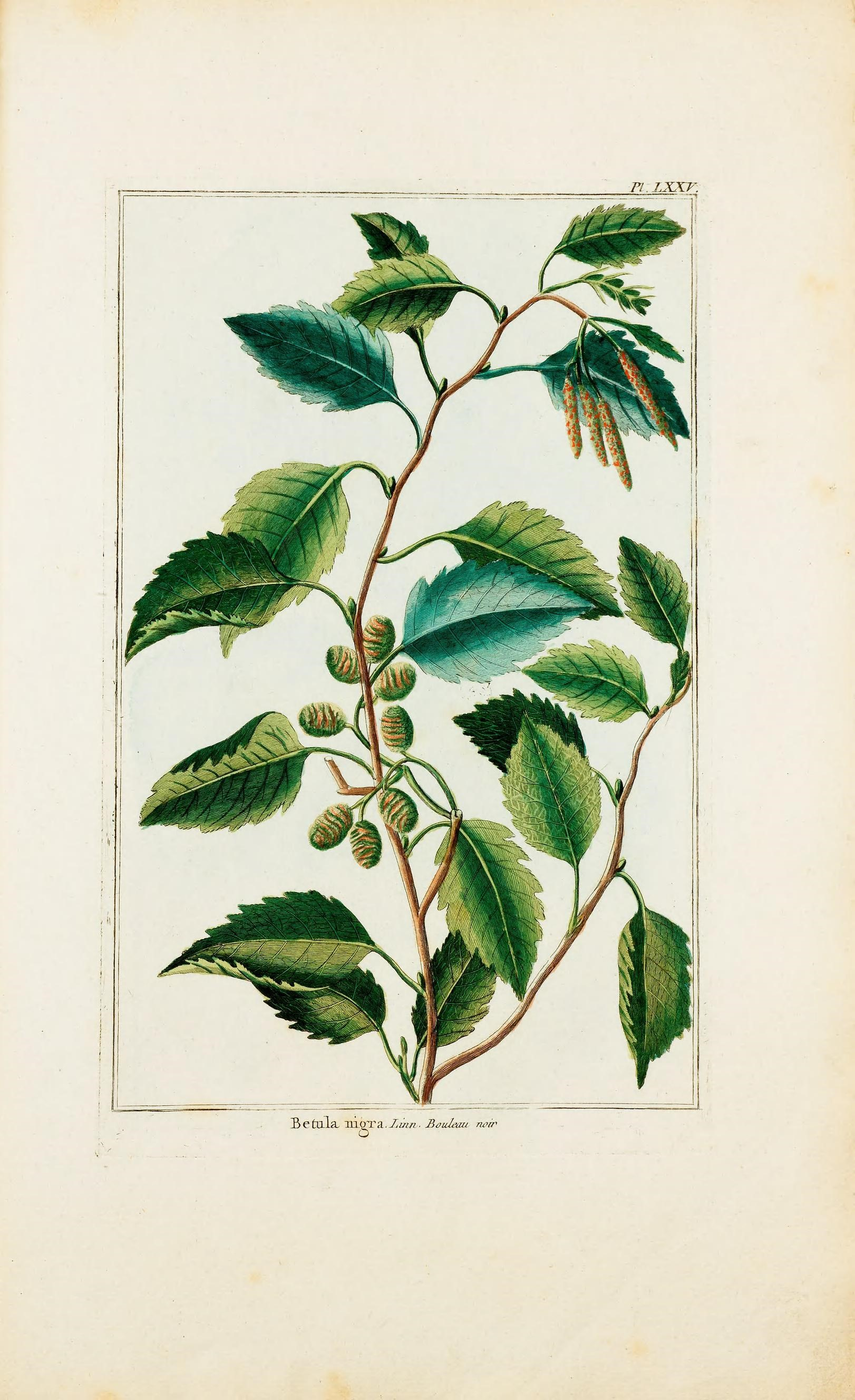
Illustration of leaves and seeds
