= Japanese privet =

The name Japanese privet may refer to either of two species of privet native to Japan:

- Ligustrum japonicum, also called wax leaf privet
- Ligustrum ovalifolium, also called golden privet
