= Metriochroa fraxinella =

Scientific classification
- Kingdom: Animalia
- Phylum: Arthropoda
- Class: Insecta
- Order: Lepidoptera
- Family: Gracillariidae
- Genus: Metriochroa
- Species: M. fraxinella

Binomial name
- Metriochroa fraxinella Kumata, 1998

Species of moth

Metriochroa fraxinella is a moth of the family Gracillariidae. It is known from Japan (Honshū, Kyūshū, and the Ogasawara Islands).

The wingspan is 5.2–8.2 mm. There are at least two generations per year in temperate Japan (Honshū and Kyūshū), because adults are on wing in summer (from June to July) and in autumn (from late September to early October).

The larvae feed on Fraxinus species (including Fraxinus sieboldiana), Ligustrum japonicum, and Ligustrum micranthum. They mine the leaves of their host plant.
