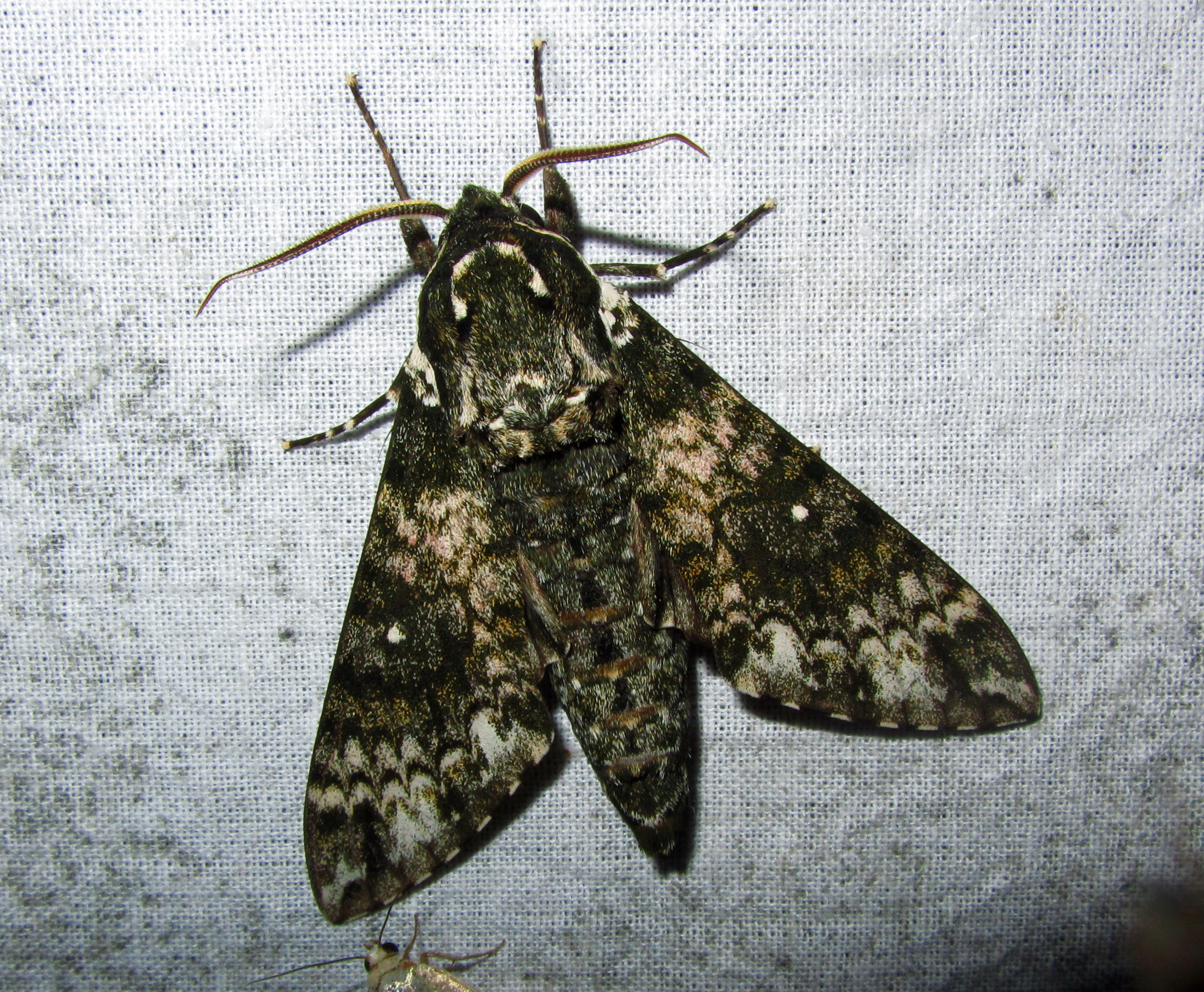

Scientific classification
- Domain: Eukaryota
- Kingdom: Animalia
- Phylum: Arthropoda
- Class: Insecta
- Order: Lepidoptera
- Family: Sphingidae
- Genus: Dolbina
- Species: D. inexacta

Binomial name
- Dolbina inexacta (Walker, 1856)

Synonyms
- Macrosila inexacta Walker, 1856; Meganoton khasianum Rothschild, 1894; Dolbina inexacta olivascens (Mell, 1922); Dolbina inexacta sinica Closs, 1914

= Dolbina inexacta =

Species of moth

Dolbina inexacta, the common grizzled hawkmoth, is a species of moth of the family Sphingidae.

== Distribution ==
It is found from Pakistan, northern and central India and Nepal across Myanmar, southern China, northern Thailand and northern Vietnam to Taiwan.

== Description ==
The wingspan is 55–86 mm. The thorax, legs and wings undersides are brown. There are large black mesial patches on the abdomen underside. The discal interspace on the forewing upperside is sometimes pinkish grey between the discal cell and the hind margin.

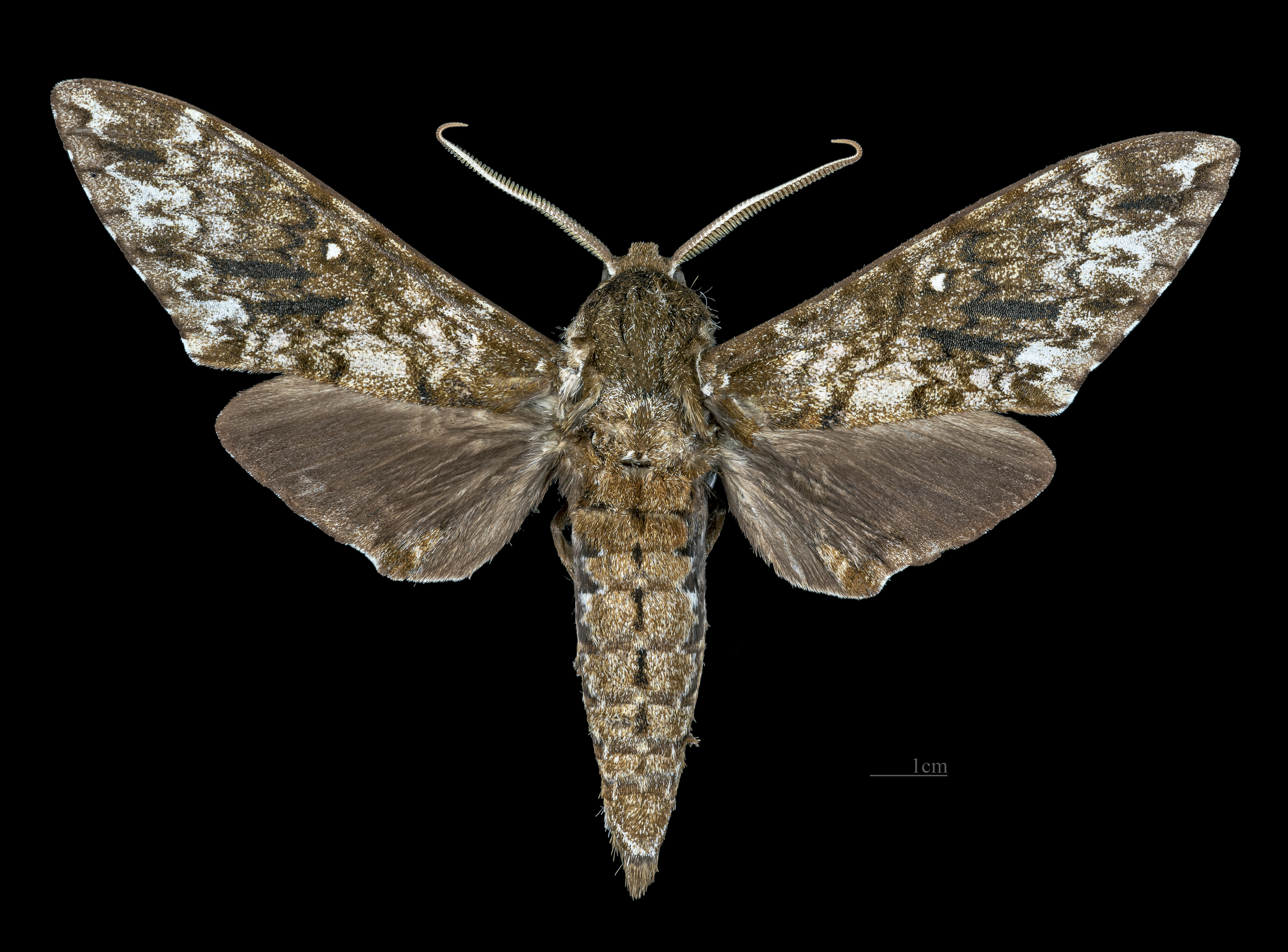
Male dorsal

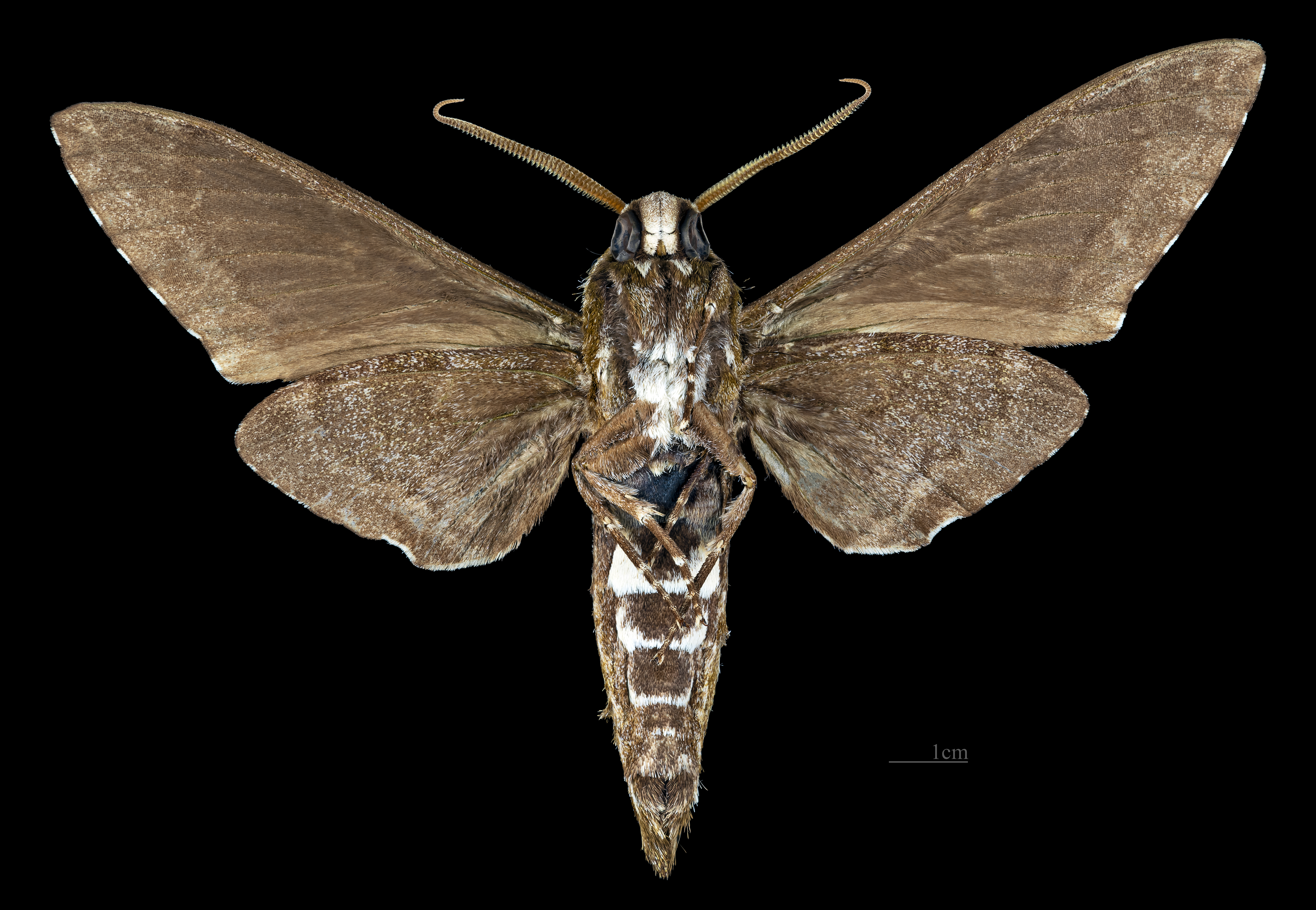
Male ventral

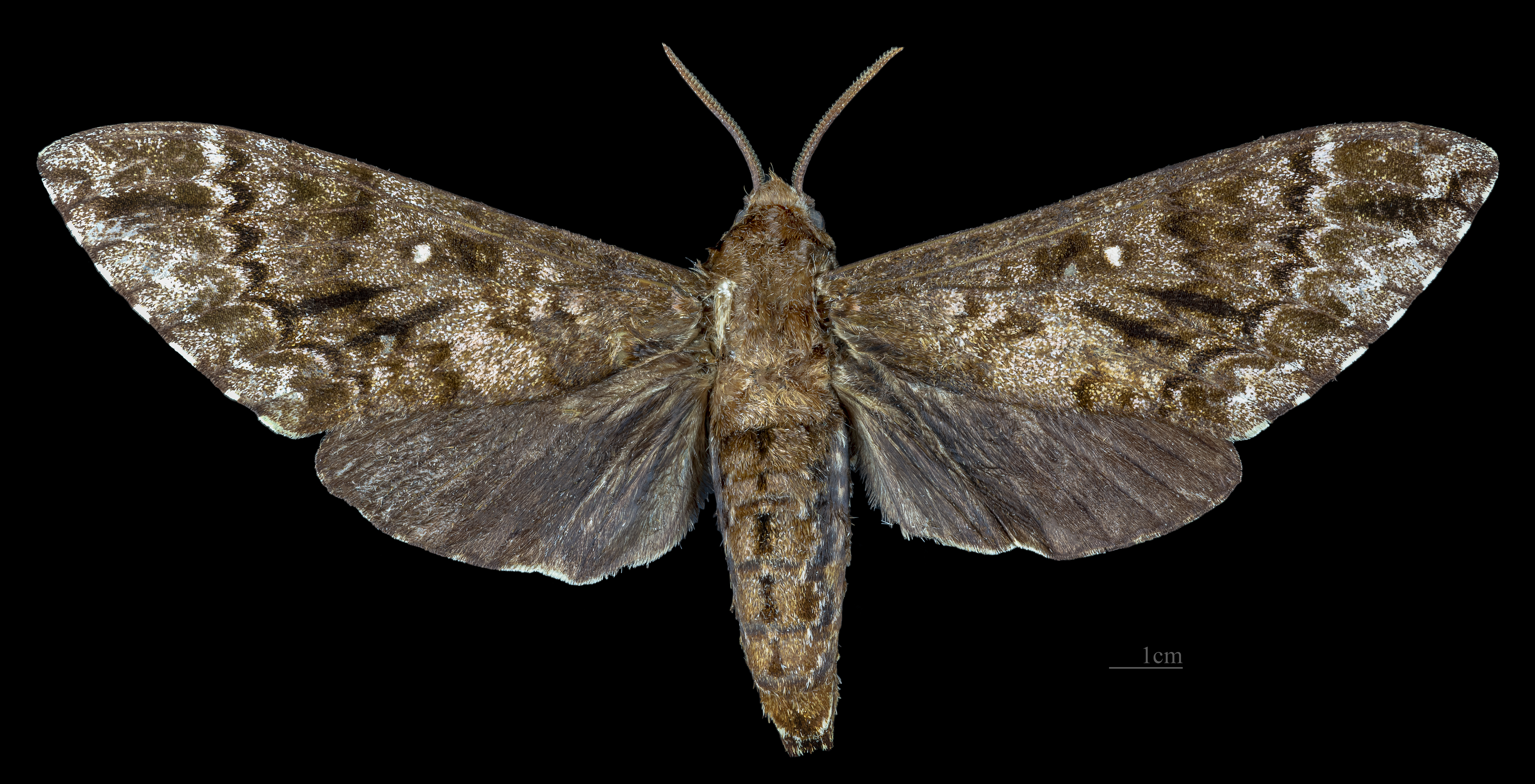
Female dorsal

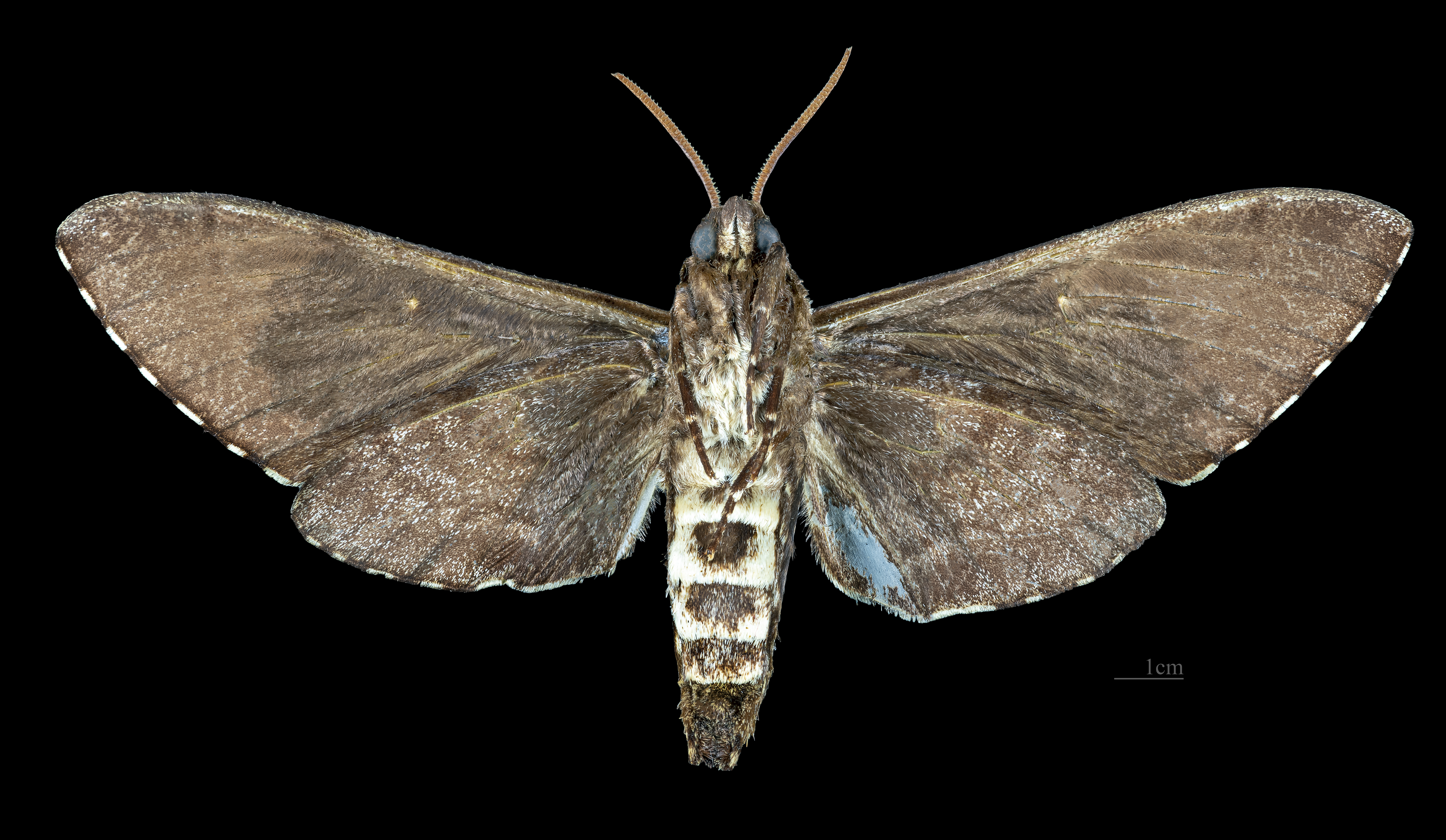
Female ventral

== Biology ==
The larvae have been recorded feeding on Ligustrum robustum in China and Olea, Lonicera, Ligustrum, Fraxinus and Osmanthus species elsewhere.
