= Ligustrum robustum =

- Ligustrum robustum in the foreground

Scientific classification
- Kingdom: Plantae
- Clade: Tracheophytes
- Clade: Angiosperms
- Clade: Eudicots
- Clade: Asterids
- Order: Lamiales
- Family: Oleaceae
- Genus: Ligustrum
- Species: L. robustum

Binomial name
- Ligustrum robustum (Roxb.) Blume

Synonyms
- Phillyrea robusta Roxb.; Ligustrum ceylanicum Decne., 1879; Ligustrum neilgherrence Decne., 1879; Ligustrum robustum Sensu Thw., 1872; Ligustrum walkeri Decne., 1879; Olea robusta (Roxb.) Sweet; Visiania robusta (Roxb.) DC.

Species of shrub

Ligustrum robustum grows as a shrub or small tree up to 10 m (30 ft) tall though old specimens of more than a hundred years have been observed with a height of 15 m (50 ft). The fruit of the shrub is an ellipsoid berry, bluish-purple when fully ripe, 7–10 mm (0.28–0.39 in) × 4–5 mm (0.16–0.20 in).

The shrub is native to South and Southeast Asia (Sri Lanka, India, Bangladesh, Myanmar (Burma), Cambodia, Thailand, Laos, Vietnam) but has become naturalized in other countries. It was introduced to Mauritius at the end of the 19th century and to La Réunion, where it has become a major invasive species. The Flora of China lists a "Ligustrum robustum subsp. chinense P. S. Green" as native to China, but more recent publications have regarded that name as a synonym of L. expansum.

Ligustrum robustum was nominated among 100 of the "World's Worst" invasive species. A moth (Epiplema albida), and two coleoptera (Dermorhytis ornatissima and Dermorhytis lewisi) are being tested for biological control programs in La Réunion but have not yet been released. Other lepidoptera that feed on this plant are Brahmaea wallichii, Pangrapta grisangula and Dolbina inexacta.

== Etymology ==
Ligustrum means ‘binder’. It was named by Pliny and Virgil.

== See also ==
- Kuding, a tisane made from its leaves
