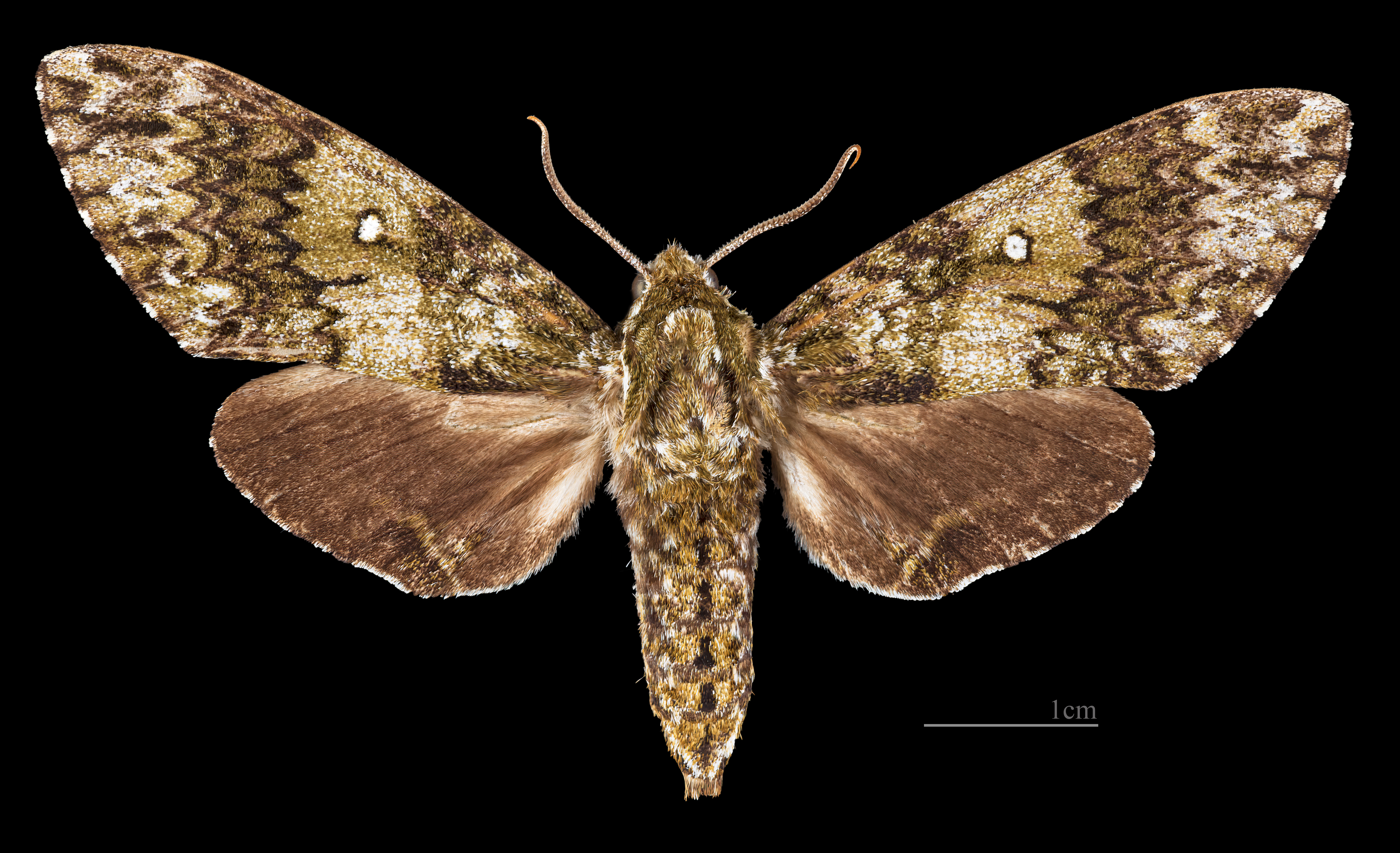
- Dolbina tancrei ♀
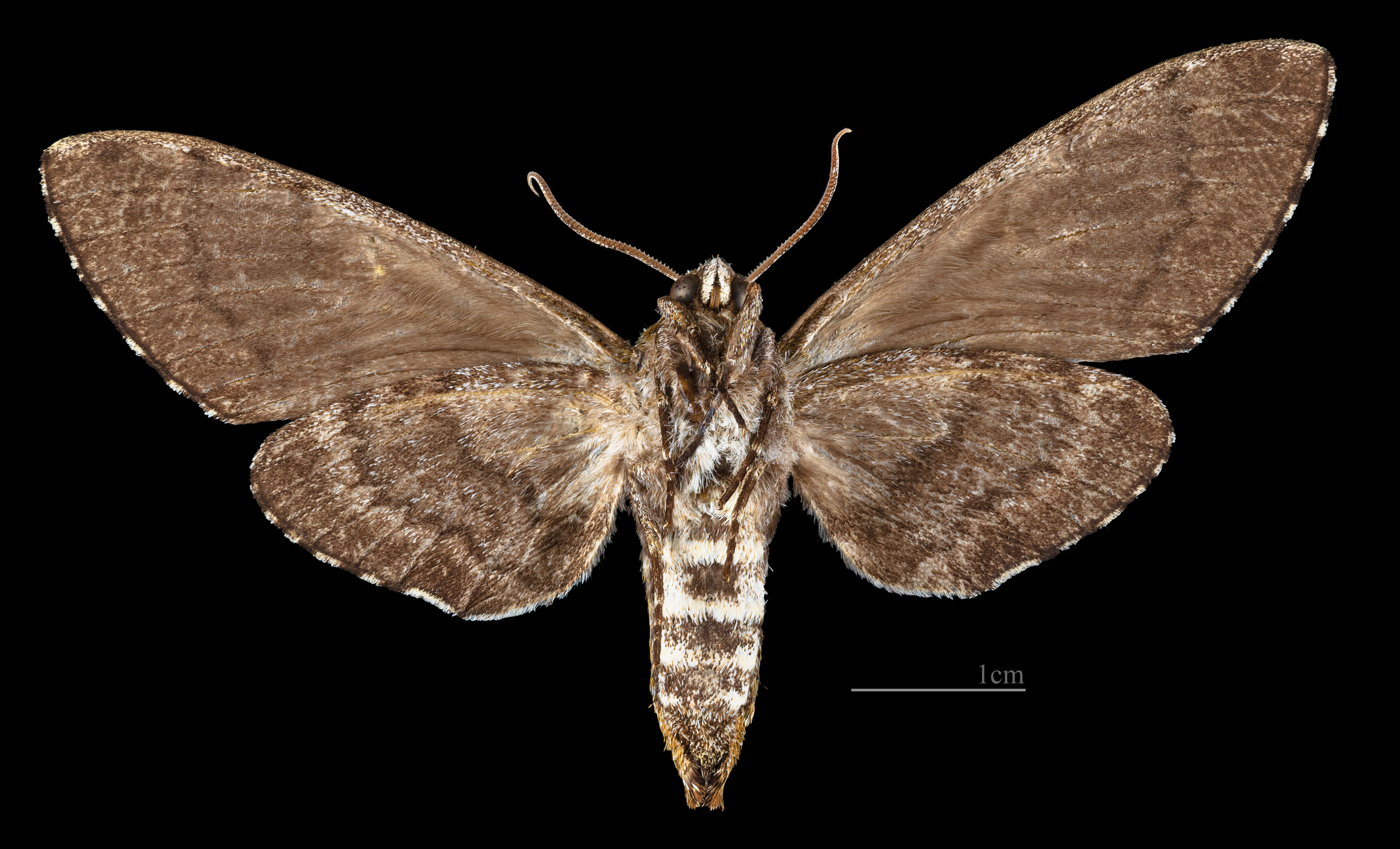
- Dolbina tancrei ♀ △

Scientific classification
- Kingdom: Animalia
- Phylum: Arthropoda
- Class: Insecta
- Order: Lepidoptera
- Family: Sphingidae
- Genus: Dolbina
- Species: D. tancrei

Binomial name
- Dolbina tancrei Staudinger, 1887

Synonyms
- Dolbina curvata Matsumura, 1921; Dolbina lateralis Matsumura, 1921

= Dolbina tancrei =

Species of moth

Dolbina tancrei is a species of moth of the family Sphingidae.

== Distribution ==
It is known from the Russian Far East, north-eastern China, the Korean Peninsula and Japan.

== Description ==
The wingspan is 50–82 mm.

== Biology ==
Adults are on wing from in May and September in two generations in northern China and in two generations with adults on wing from May to June and in August in Russia. In Korea, adults have been recorded from late May to late August.

The larvae have been recorded feeding on Fraxinus and Syringa species in Primorskiy, Ligustrum japonicum, Ligustrum obtusifolium and Fraxinus rhynchophylla in Korea and Ligustrum japonicum, Ligustrum obtusifolium, Olea europaea and Osmanthus fragrans in Japan.
