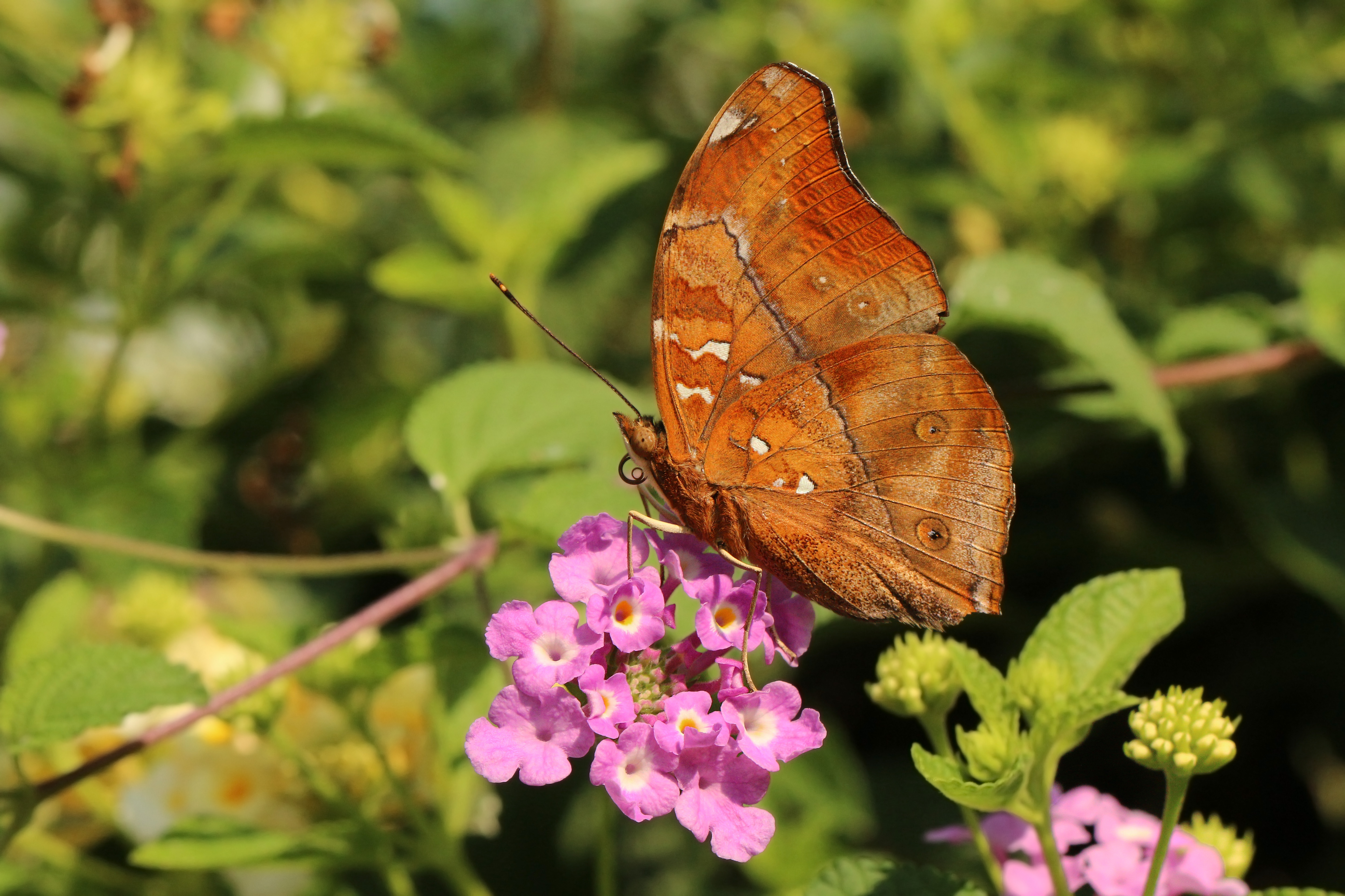
- Ventral view Bali, Indonesia
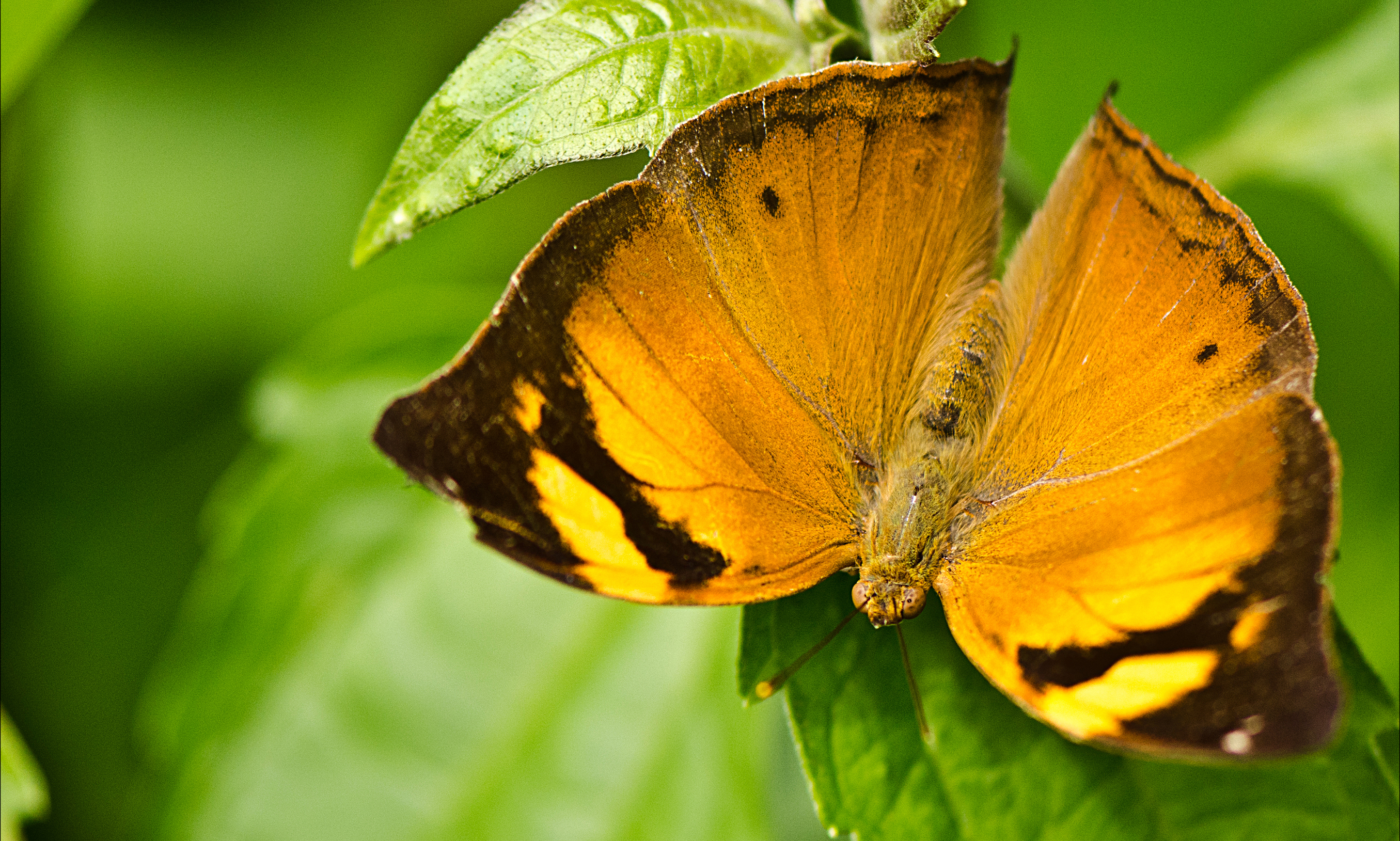
- Dorsal view

Scientific classification
- Kingdom: Animalia
- Phylum: Arthropoda
- Clade: Pancrustacea
- Class: Insecta
- Order: Lepidoptera
- Family: Nymphalidae
- Genus: Doleschallia
- Species: D. bisaltide

Binomial name
- Doleschallia bisaltide (Cramer, 1777)

Subspecies
- See text

= Doleschallia bisaltide =

Autumn leaf

Species of butterfly

Doleschallia bisaltide, the autumn leaf, is a nymphalid butterfly found in South Asia, Southeast Asia, and Australasia. In Australia it is also known as the leafwing.

== Description ==
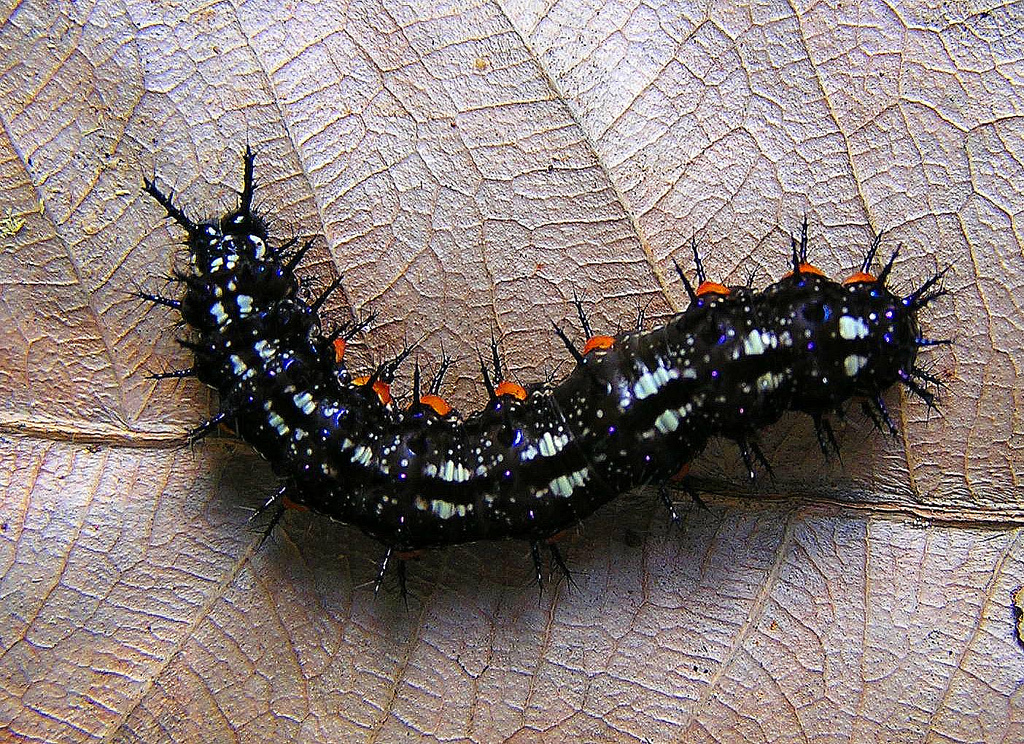
D. bisaltide fourth instar larva

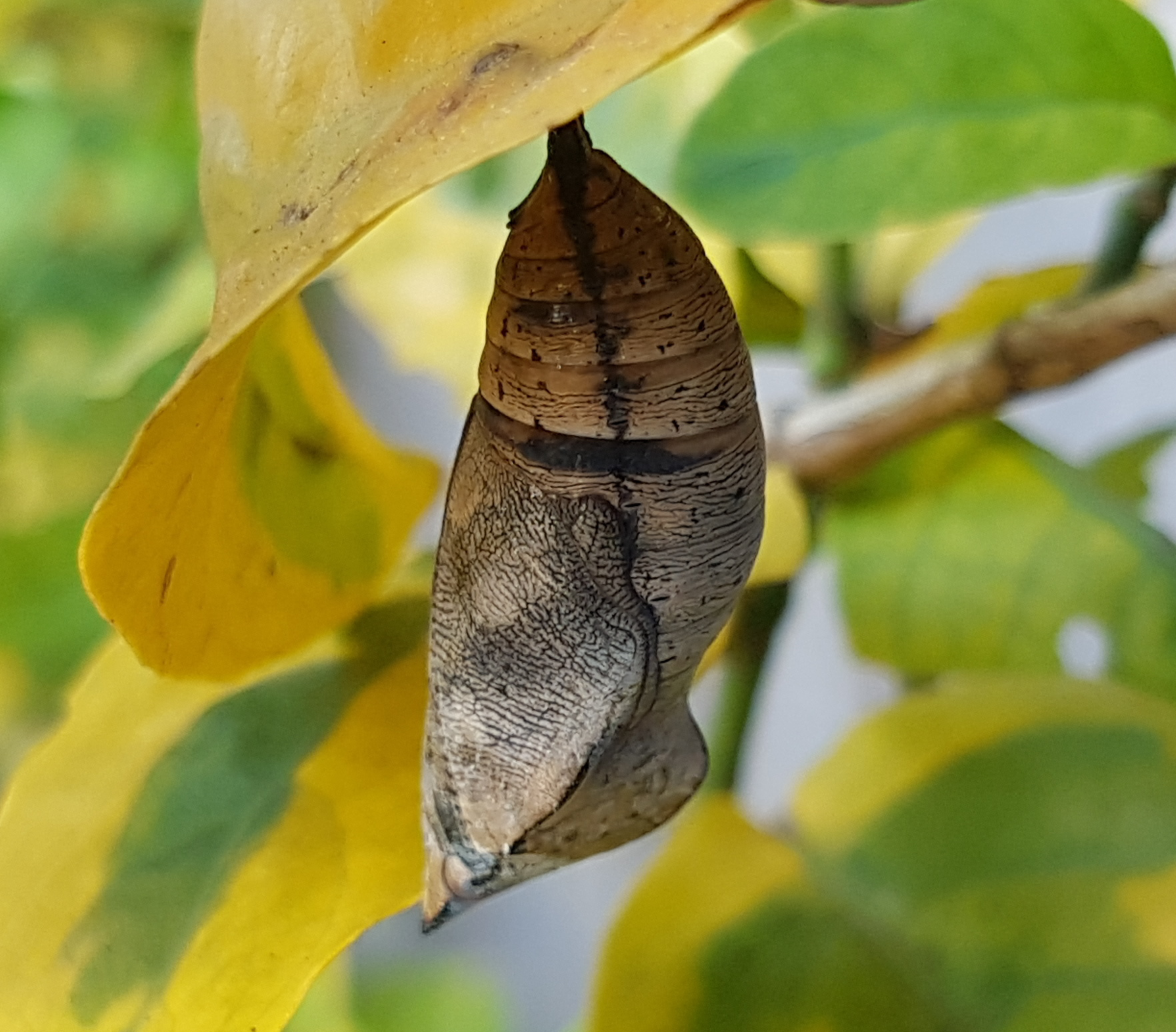
D. bisaltide pupa

The larvae are black, with two rows of dorsal white spots. Head with a pair of branched spines; rest of the segments with a dorsal and a lateral row of blue branched spines on each side. They feed on Artocarpus, Pseuderanthemum, Calycanthus, Ruellia, Girardina, Strobilanthus and Graptophyllum. The pupae are yellowish with numerous black spots; constricted in the middle; head produced into two points. There are several subspecies under Doleschallia bisaltide:

- Doleschallia bisaltide andamanensis Fruhstorfer, 1899

This subspecies closely resembles the Indian form, but differs in the oblique yellow band on the upperside of the forewing, which is broader and extends from the middle of the costal margin uninterruptedly to interspace 4, though it is preapically constricted. On the upperside of the hindwing there is an inner as well as an outer conspicuous subterminal narrow-black band. On the underside, this subspecies is as variable as the typical form, but the ground colour in many specimens (presumably wet-season broods) is of a richer, almost metallic green, with the basal snow-white spots defined with black lines; the ocelli in interspaces 2 and 5 seem also to be more clearly defined than in the Indian form. Antennae, head, thorax and abdomen as in malabarica.

This subspecies has been seen in the South Andaman (Chidiyatapu), Car Nicobar, Central Nicobars and at Great Nicobar. They are attracted to the flowers of Ligustrum glomeratum and larvae have been discovered on Pseuderanthemum album (Acanthaceae).

- Doleschallia bisaltide apameia Fruhstorfer, 1912

Found in the Obi Islands.

- Doleschallia bisaltide australis C. & R. Felder, 1867

The leafwing. Found in Indonesia, Torres Strait Islands, and northeastern Australia.

- Doleschallia bisaltide bougainvillensis Strand, 1920

Found in Bougainville.

- Doleschallia bisaltide cethega Fruhstorfer, 1912

Found in Sulawesi.

- Doleschallia bisaltide ceylonica Fruhstorfer, 1903

The Ceylon autumn leaf. Found in Sri Lanka.

- Doleschallia bisaltide continentalis Fruhstorfer, 1899

Found in southern China, Indochina and Malaysia. Doleschallia bisaltide siamensis is a synonym.

- Doleschallia bisaltide denisi Viette, 1950

Found in New Caledonia and the Loyalty Islands.

- Doleschallia bisaltide gurelca Grose-Smith & Kirby, 1893

Found in the Bismarck Archipelago and the Admiralty Islands

- Doleschallia bisaltide herrichi Butler, 1876

Found in New Hebrides.

- Doleschallia bisaltide indica Moore, 1899

The Himalayan autumn leaf. Found in northern India and Nepal.

- Doleschallia bisaltide karabachica Tytler, 1940
- Doleschallia bisaltide malabarica Fruhstorfer, 1899

Male's and female's underside yellowish brown, paling anteriorly to rich golden yellow on the forewing, shading anteriorly into dusky brown on the hindwing. Forewing: the apical half black, following a line from vein 12 opposite the discocellulars, passing through apex of cell, obliquely across middle of interspace 3 and curving down to tornus; a black spot near apex of cell coalescing with the inner margin of 1he black colour; a short, very oblique, broad golden-yellow band, broader in the female than in the male, from middle of costal margin to interspace 5; a spot beyond in line with it in interspace 4; two, sometimes three, minute, preapical white specks; the cilia fulvous (tawny), touched with white, anteriorly. Hindwing uniform; the costal margin broadly as noted above, a subterminal narrow band and narrower terminal line posteriorly, dusky black; a postdiscal black spot in interspaces 2 and 5 respectively; the cilia fulvous.

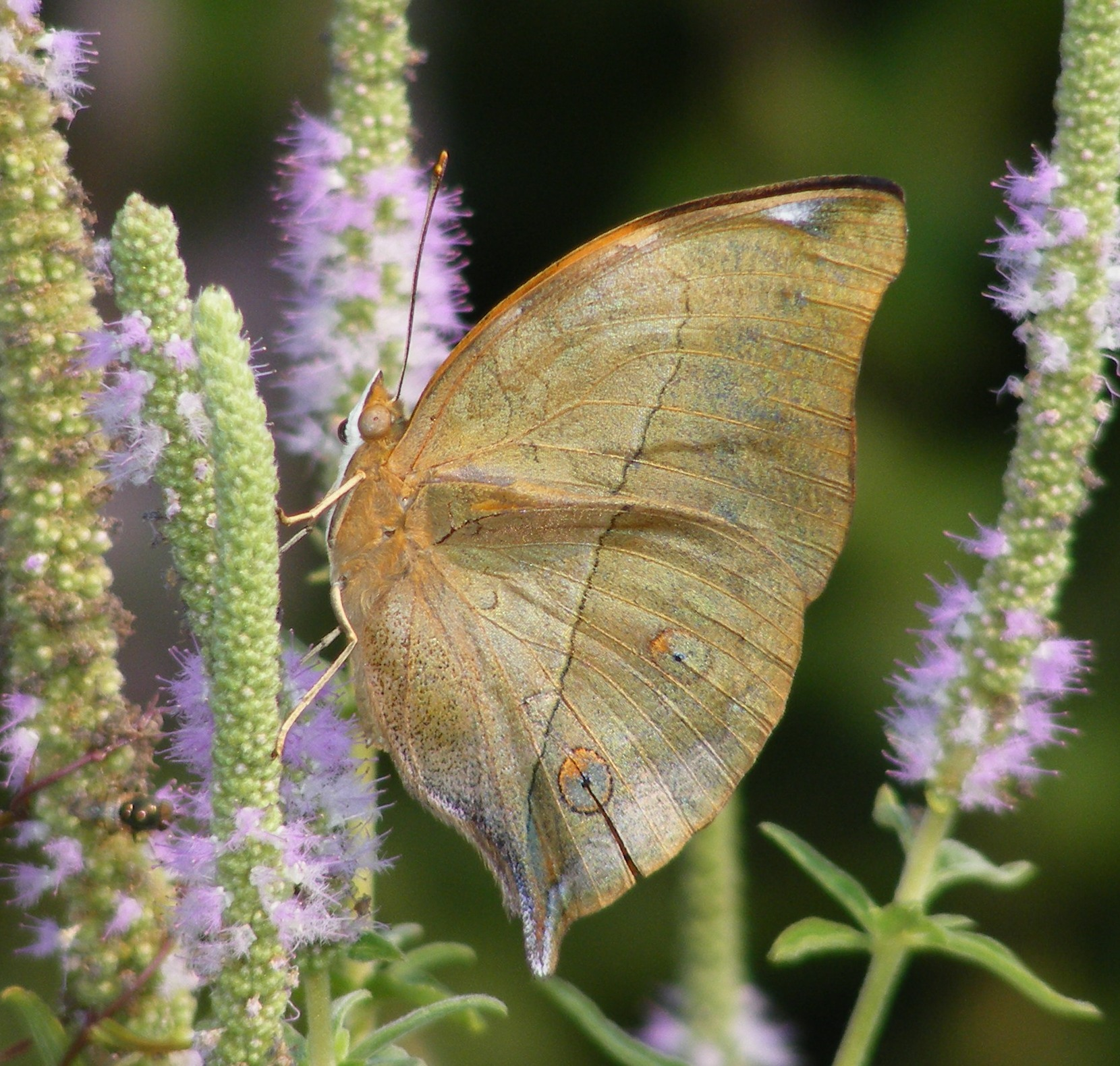
Doleschallia bisaltide malabarica, female

Underside very variable, closely resembling a dry leaf. No two specimens are ever alike. The ground colour varies from reddish to dark greenish brown with irrorations (speckles) of greyish and black scales; apex of the forewing and the terminal margin posteriorly of the hindwing more or less lilacine; forewings and hindwings crossed by a dark narrow discal fascia, generally bordered on the inner side by a greyish line; this fascia bent inwards at right angles above vein 6 of the forewing and in most specimens, bordered internally by a diffuse pale patch and externally by an oblique whitish mark, beyond which is a subcostal white spot, followed by a transverse sinuous postdiscal series of obscure ocelli crossing both wings, each ocellus centred by a minute dot, white on the fore, black on the hindwing. In the male there are generally, but not invariably, a number of whitish spots on the basal areas of both wings. Antennae blackish brown, ochraceous at apex; head, thorax and abdomen dark fulvous brown; beneath, the palpi white, the thorax and abdomen pale brown. Wingspan is about 84 to 88 mm (3.3 to 3.5 in). Found from Sikkim, S. India, Ceylon, Assam, Myanmar and Tenasserim.

- Doleschallia bisaltide menexema Fruhstorfer, 1912

Found in the Treasury Islands, Shortlands, Guadalcanal, and possibly the Solomon Islands.

- Doleschallia bisaltide merguiana Evans, 1924
- Doleschallia bisaltide montrouzieri Butler, 1876

Found in New Hebrides.

- Doleschallia bisaltide nasica Fruhstorfer, 1907

Found in Waigeu.

- Doleschallia bisaltide nigromarginata Joicey & Noakes, 1915

Found in Biak.

- Doleschallia bisaltide tualensis Fruhstorfer, 1899

Found in Kai Island

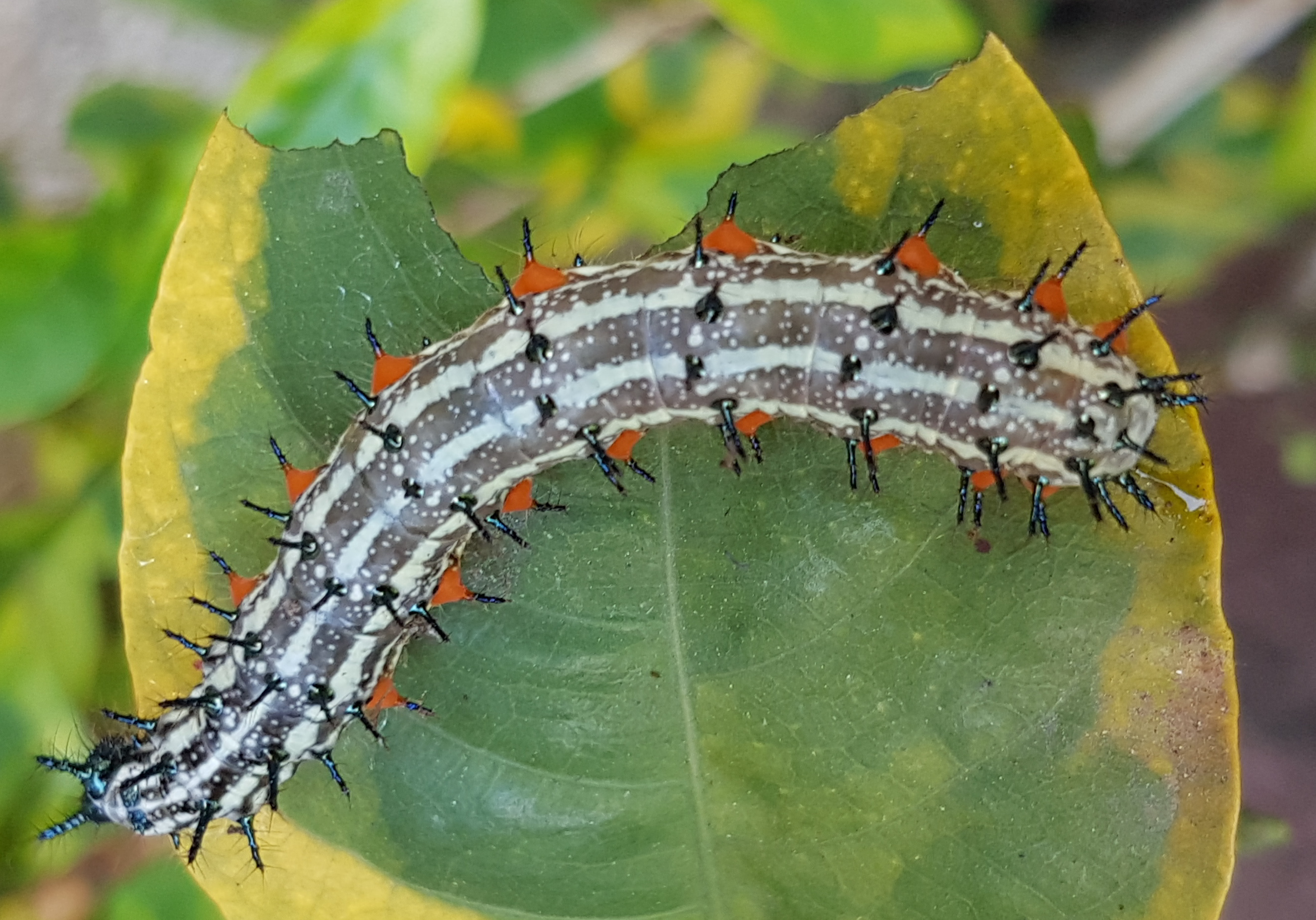
D. b. philippensis fifth instar larva on Graptophyllum pictum

- Doleschallia bisaltide philippensis Fruhstorfer, 1899

Found in the Philippines.

- Doleschallia bisaltide pratipa C. & R. Felder, 1860

Found in peninsular Thailand, Singapore, and Malaysia.

- Doleschallia bisaltide rennellensis Howarth, 1962

Found in Rennell and the Bellona Islands.

- Doleschallia bisaltide scapus Fruhstorfer, 1912

Found in Indonesia and Timor.

- Doleschallia bisaltide sciron Godman & Salvin, 1888

Found in the Treasury Islands, Shortlands, and Guadalcanal.

- Doleschallia bisaltide tenimberensis Fruhstorfer, 1912

Found in Biak.

- Doleschallia bisaltide tualensis Fruhstorfer, 1899

Found in Kai Island
