= Metriochroa =

Scientific classification
- Domain: Eukaryota
- Kingdom: Animalia
- Phylum: Arthropoda
- Class: Insecta
- Order: Lepidoptera
- Family: Gracillariidae
- Subfamily: Phyllocnistinae
- Genus: Metriochroa; Busck, 1900

Species
- See text

Synonyms
- Oecophyllembius Silvestri, 1908

Genus of moths

Metriochroa is a genus of moths in the family Gracillariidae.

== Species ==
- Metriochroa alboannulata Bai, 2016
- Metriochroa argyrocelis Vári, 1961
- Metriochroa carissae Vári, 1963
- Metriochroa celidota Bradley, 1965
- Metriochroa fraxinella Kumata, 1998
- Metriochroa inferior (Silvestri, 1914)
- Metriochroa latifoliella (Millière, 1886)
- Metriochroa pergulariae Vári, 1961
- Metriochroa psychotriella Busck, 1900
- Metriochroa scotinopa Vári, 1963
- Metriochroa symplocosella Kobayashi, Huang & Hirowatari, 2013
- Metriochroa syringae Kumata, 1998
- Metriochroa tylophorae Vári, 1961
