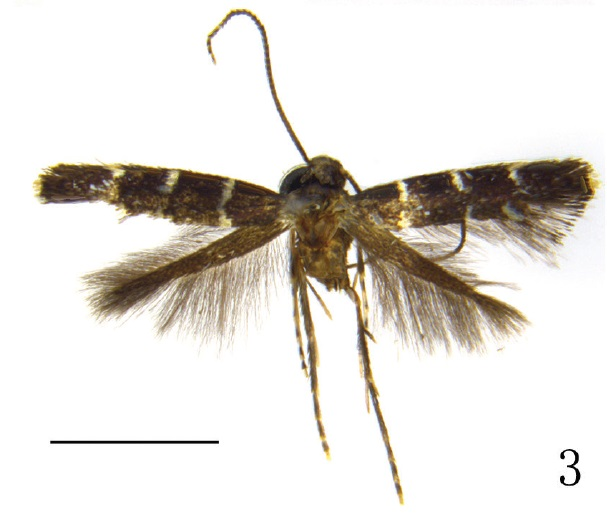

Scientific classification
- Kingdom: Animalia
- Phylum: Arthropoda
- Class: Insecta
- Order: Lepidoptera
- Family: Gracillariidae
- Genus: Metriochroa
- Species: M. alboannulata

Binomial name
- Metriochroa alboannulata Bai, 2016

= Metriochroa alboannulata =

Species of moth

Metriochroa alboannulata is a moth of the family Gracillariidae. It is found in Jiangxi, China.

The wingspan is 6.5–7.5 mm. The forewings are fuscous, shining with purple and with two silvery white fasciae, the first at the basal one-fourth, and slightly outwardly angulate on the wing fold, the second at the subapex and outwardly oblique. The costa and dorsum have an outwardly oblique bar-shaped silvery white speck at the middle, the costal speck longer than the dorsal one. The dorsum has a silvery white speck near the tornus. The hindwings are fuscous.

== Etymology ==
The specific name is composed of albus and annulatus, meaning with white ring, referring to the flagellum of the antenna with white rings on its distal part.
