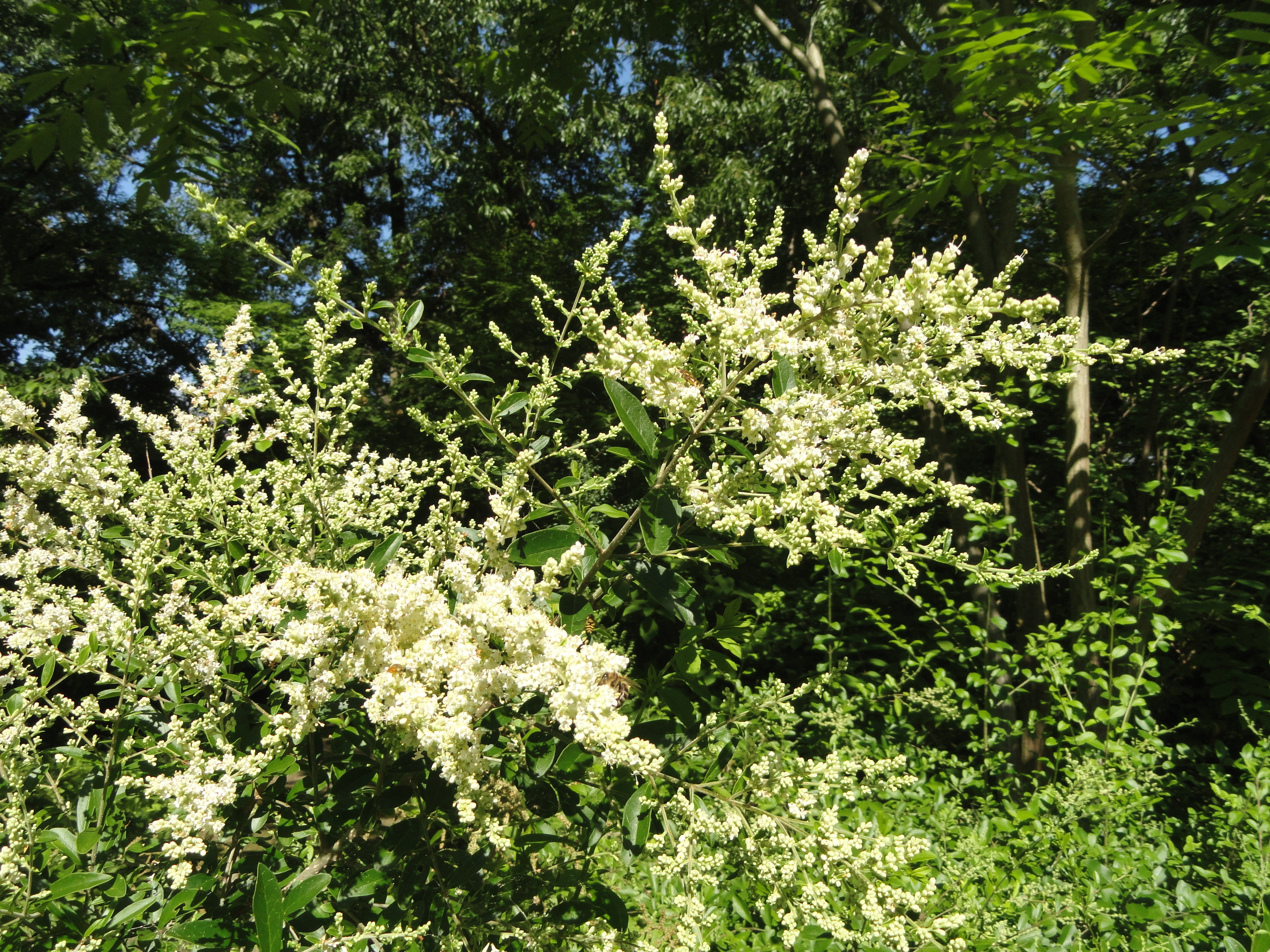

Scientific classification
- Kingdom: Plantae
- Clade: Tracheophytes
- Clade: Angiosperms
- Clade: Eudicots
- Clade: Asterids
- Order: Lamiales
- Family: Oleaceae
- Genus: Ligustrum
- Species: L. quihoui

Binomial name
- Ligustrum quihoui Carrière

= Ligustrum quihoui =

Waxyleaf privet

Species of shrub

Ligustrum quihoui, or waxyleaf privet, is a shrub native to Korea and China (Anhui, Guizhou, Henan, Hubei, Jiangsu, Jiangxi, Shaanxi, Shandong, Sichuan, Xizang (Tibet), Yunnan, Zhejiang). As with some other members of the genus, L. quihoui is cultivated as an ornamental in many places and has become naturalized and invasive in urban areas and scattered forested locales of the southeastern United States (Texas, Oklahoma, Alabama, Mississippi, Florida, North Carolina, Virginia, Maryland).

Ligustrum quihoui is a shrubby, semi-evergreen to evergreen privet, one to three meters high. It is noted for its large sparse flowering panicles of scented white flowers, borne late in the growing season, for which it is sometimes grown in gardens.

== Etymology ==
Ligustrum means 'binder'. It was named by Pliny and Virgil.

Quihoui was named for M. Quihou, once superintendent of the Jardin d'Acclimatation in Paris.
