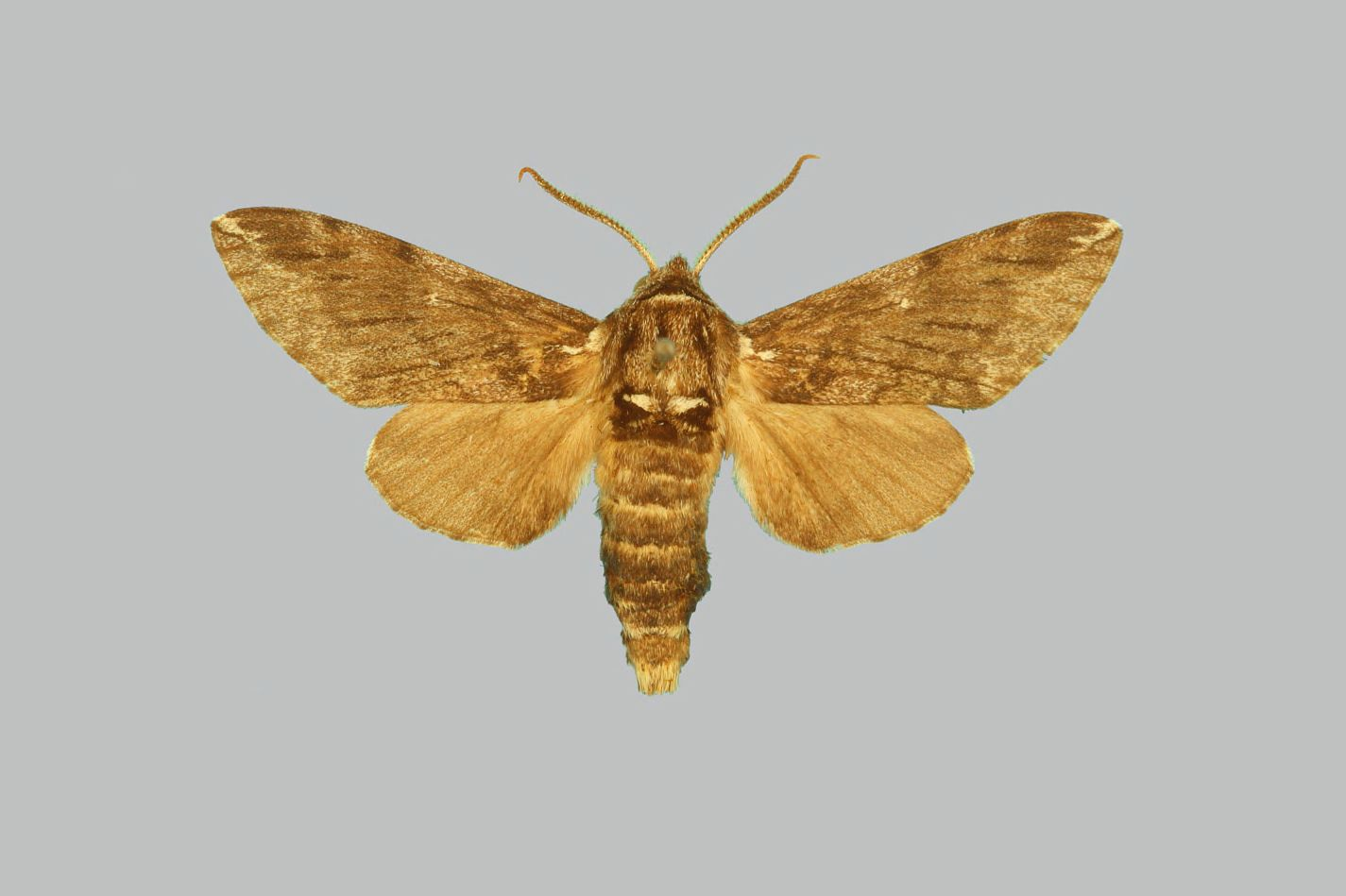
- Dolbina elegans

Scientific classification
- Domain: Eukaryota
- Kingdom: Animalia
- Phylum: Arthropoda
- Class: Insecta
- Order: Lepidoptera
- Family: Sphingidae
- Genus: Dolbina
- Species: D. elegans

Binomial name
- Dolbina elegans A. Bang-Haas, 1912

Synonyms
- Dolbina elegans steffensi Popescu-Gorj, 1971

= Dolbina elegans =

Ash hawkmoth

Species of moth

Dolbina elegans, the ash hawkmoth, is a moth of the family Sphingidae. The species was first described by Andreas Bang-Haas in 1912. It is found from Ukraine, Moldavia, through eastern Romania and eastern and southern Bulgaria, northern Greece, western and southern Turkey to northern Syria, western Jordan, Israel, northern Iraq and northern Iran.

The wingspan is 40–53 millimetres (1.6–2.1 in). There are two to three generations per year. Adults are on wing from April and May to early September. In Europe they are mainly found in July and in April in southern Bulgaria.

The larvae probably feed on Fraxinus species.
