= Dolbina mindanaensis =

Scientific classification
- Kingdom: Animalia
- Phylum: Arthropoda
- Class: Insecta
- Order: Lepidoptera
- Family: Sphingidae
- Genus: Dolbina
- Species: D. mindanaensis

Binomial name
- Dolbina mindanaensis Brechlin, 2009

Species of moth

Dolbina mindanaensis is a species of moth of the family Sphingidae. It was identified in the Philippines.
