= Metriochroa celidota =

Scientific classification
- Kingdom: Animalia
- Phylum: Arthropoda
- Class: Insecta
- Order: Lepidoptera
- Family: Gracillariidae
- Genus: Metriochroa
- Species: M. celidota

Binomial name
- Metriochroa celidota Bradley, 1965

Species of moth

Metriochroa celidota is a moth of the family Gracillariidae. It is known from Uganda.
