= Metriochroa latifoliella =

Scientific classification
- Domain: Eukaryota
- Kingdom: Animalia
- Phylum: Arthropoda
- Class: Insecta
- Order: Lepidoptera
- Family: Gracillariidae
- Genus: Metriochroa
- Species: M. latifoliella

Binomial name
- Metriochroa latifoliella (Millière, 1886)

Synonyms
- Gracilaria latifoliella Millière, 1886

Species of moth

Metriochroa latifoliella is a moth of the family Gracillariidae. It is known from the Mediterranean region.

The larvae feed on Olea europaea, Phillyrea angustifolia and Phillyrea latifolia. They mine the leaves of their host plant.
