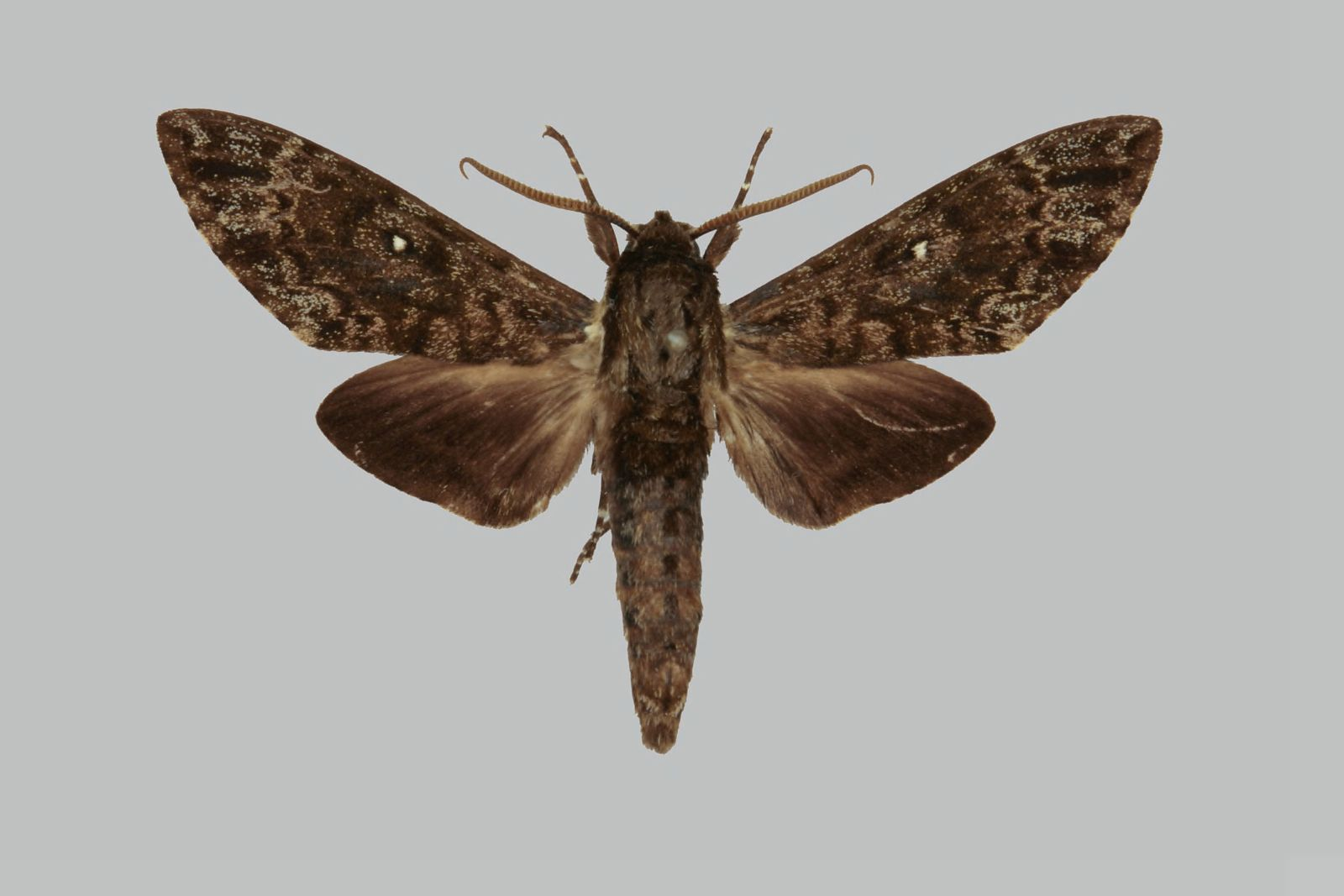

Scientific classification
- Kingdom: Animalia
- Phylum: Arthropoda
- Clade: Pancrustacea
- Class: Insecta
- Order: Lepidoptera
- Family: Sphingidae
- Genus: Dolbina
- Species: D. schnitzleri

Binomial name
- Dolbina schnitzleri Cadiou, 1997

= Dolbina schnitzleri =

Species of moth

Dolbina schnitzleri is a species of moth of the family Sphingidae. It is known from Sulawesi.
