= Metriochroa pergulariae =

Scientific classification
- Kingdom: Animalia
- Phylum: Arthropoda
- Class: Insecta
- Order: Lepidoptera
- Family: Gracillariidae
- Genus: Metriochroa
- Species: M. pergulariae

Binomial name
- Metriochroa pergulariae Vári, 1961

Species of moth

Metriochroa pergulariae is a moth of the family Gracillariidae. It is known from South Africa.

The larvae feed on Pergularia daemia and Pergularia extensa. They mine the leaves of their host plant.
