= Metriochroa inferior =

Scientific classification
- Domain: Eukaryota
- Kingdom: Animalia
- Phylum: Arthropoda
- Class: Insecta
- Order: Lepidoptera
- Family: Gracillariidae
- Genus: Metriochroa
- Species: M. inferior

Binomial name
- Metriochroa inferior (Silvestri, 1915)

Synonyms
- Oecophyllembius inferior Silvestri, 1915

Species of moth

Metriochroa inferior is a moth of the family Gracillariidae. It is known from Eritrea.

The larvae feed on Olea chrysophylla. They probably mine the leaves of their host plant.
