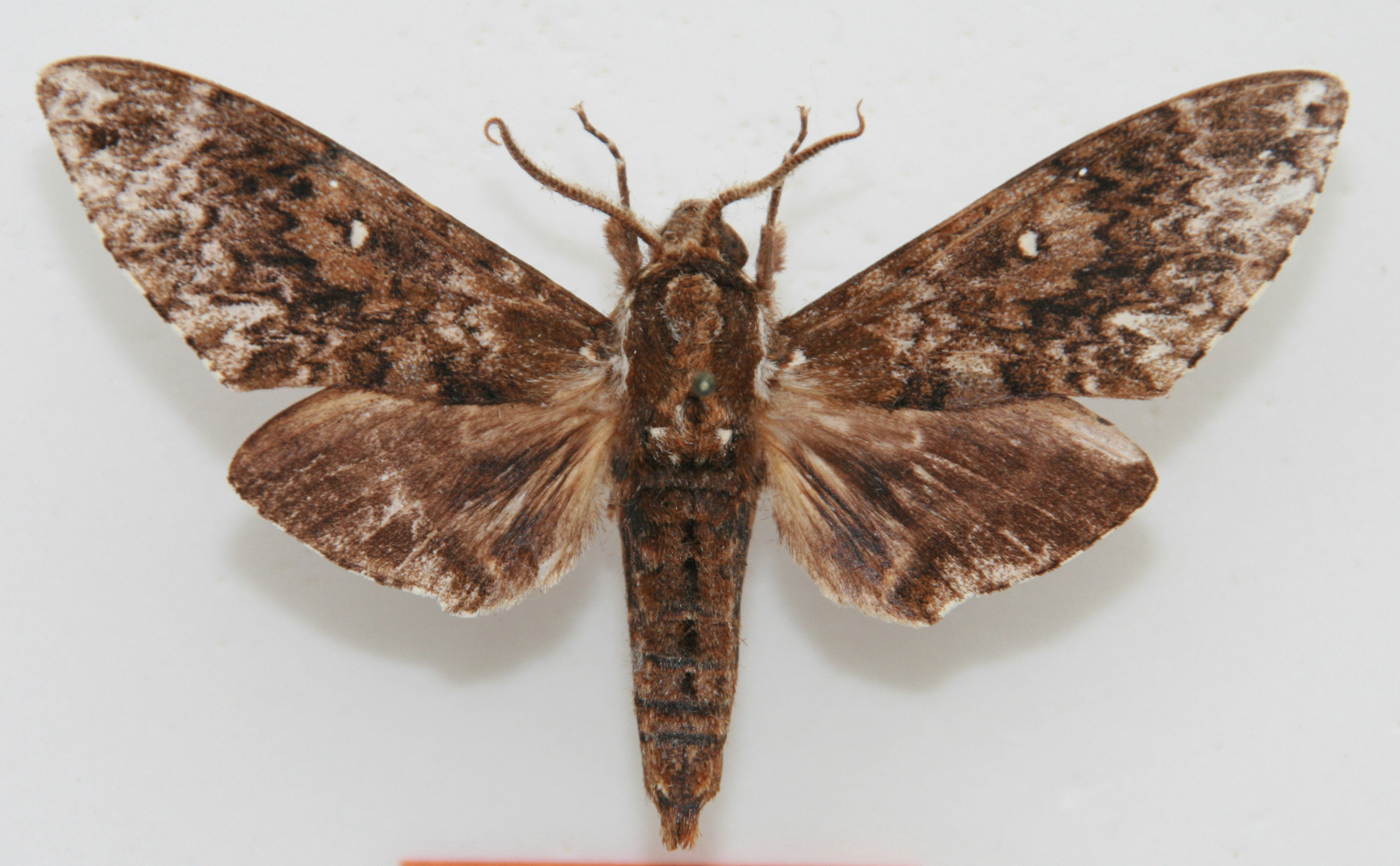

Scientific classification
- Kingdom: Animalia
- Phylum: Arthropoda
- Class: Insecta
- Order: Lepidoptera
- Family: Sphingidae
- Genus: Dolbina
- Species: D. paraexacta

Binomial name
- Dolbina paraexacta Brechlin, 2009

= Dolbina paraexacta =

Species of moth

Dolbina paraexacta is a species of moth of the family Sphingidae. It is known from China.
