= Metriochroa symplocosella =

Scientific classification
- Kingdom: Animalia
- Phylum: Arthropoda
- Class: Insecta
- Order: Lepidoptera
- Family: Gracillariidae
- Genus: Metriochroa
- Species: M. symplocosella

Binomial name
- Metriochroa symplocosella Kobayashi, Huang & Hirowatari, 2013

Species of moth

Metriochroa symplocosella is a moth of the family Gracillariidae. It is found in Hunan, China.

The wingspan is 6.2–8 mm. The larvae feed on Symplocos anomala and Symplocos sumuntia, mining the leaves of their host plant.

== Etymology ==
The specific name is derived from Symplocos, the generic name of the host plant.
