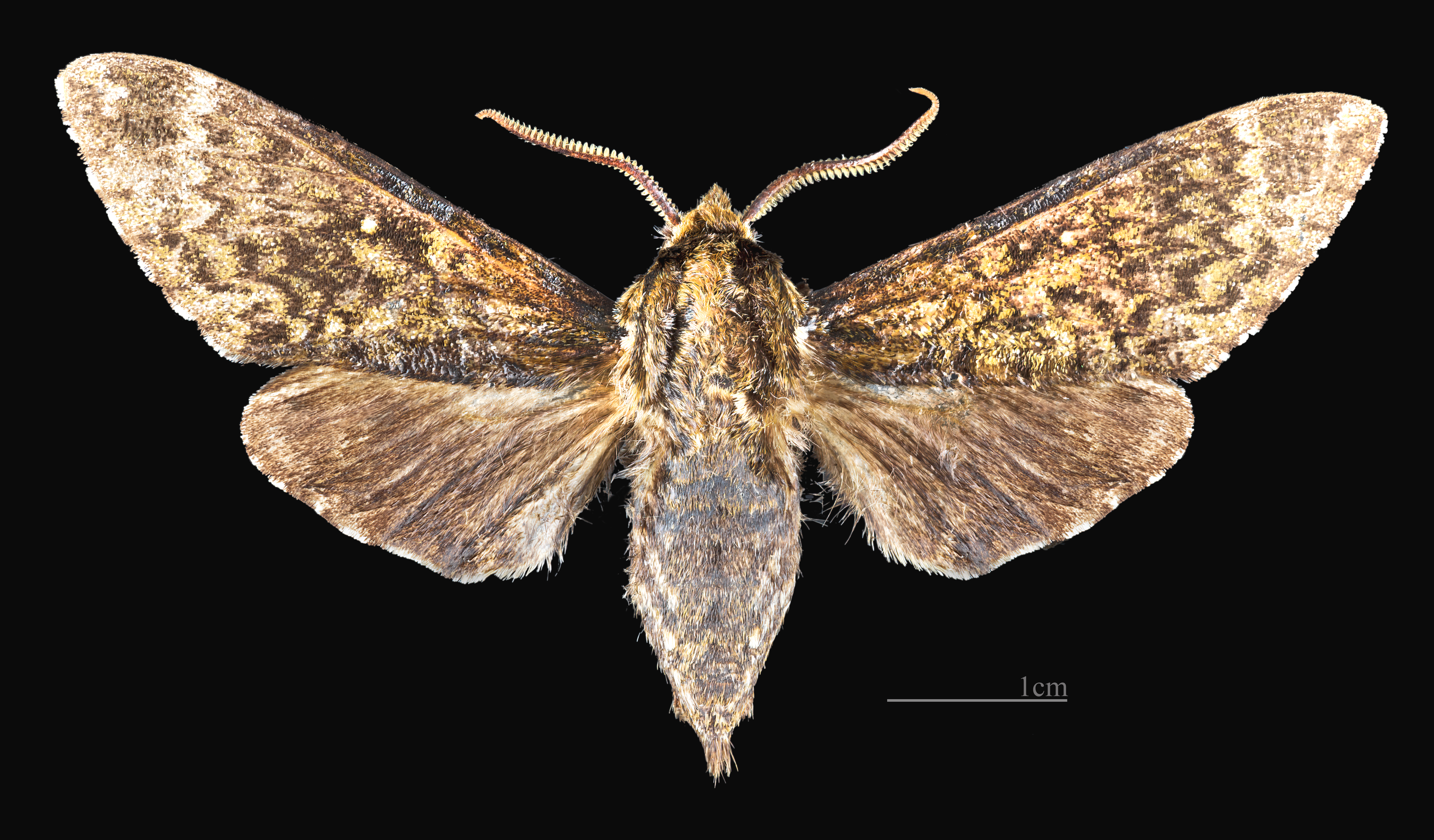
- Dolbina exacta ♂
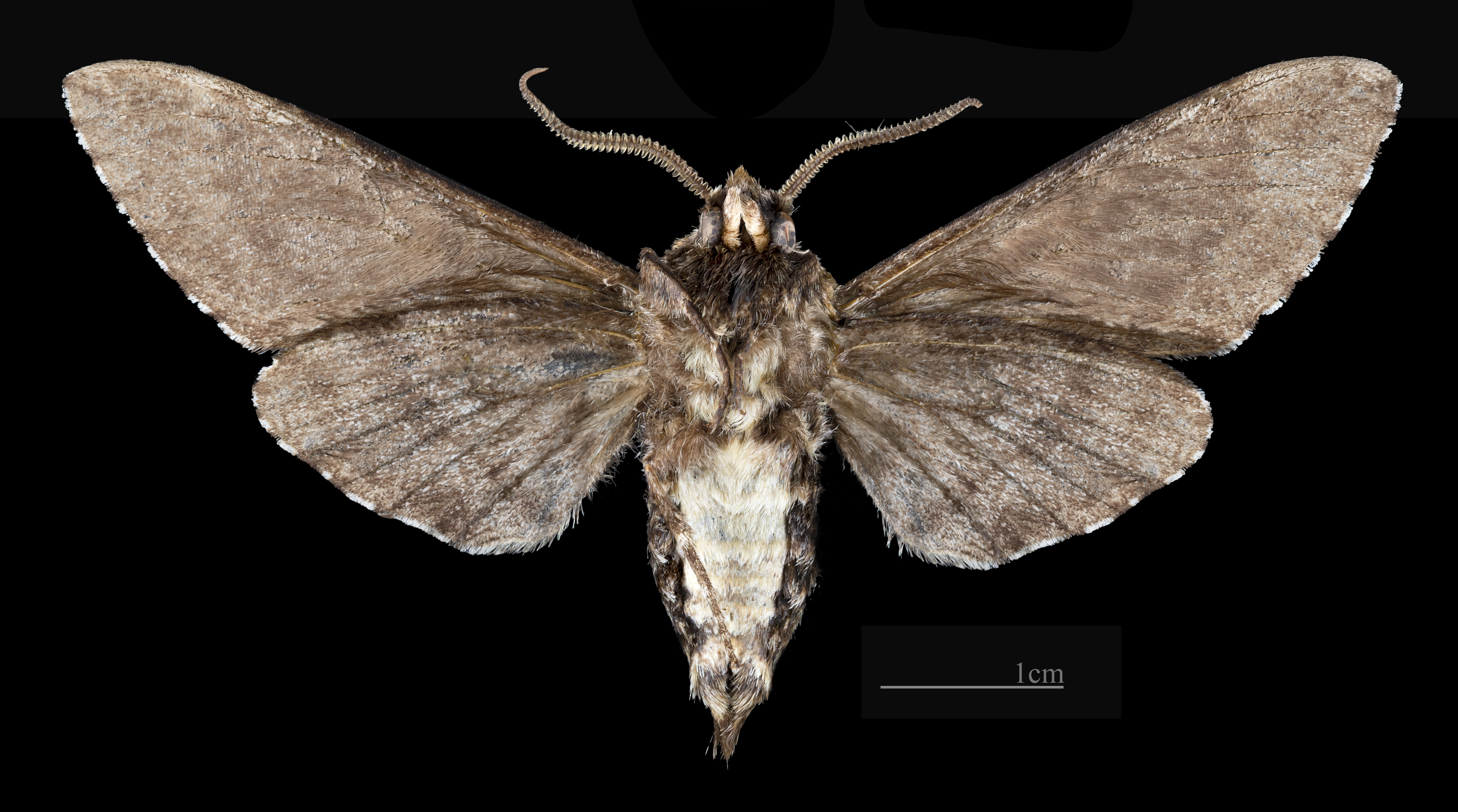
- Dolbina exacta ♂ △

Scientific classification
- Domain: Eukaryota
- Kingdom: Animalia
- Phylum: Arthropoda
- Class: Insecta
- Order: Lepidoptera
- Family: Sphingidae
- Genus: Dolbina
- Species: D. exacta

Binomial name
- Dolbina exacta Staudinger, 1892

Synonyms
- Dolbina parva Matsumura, 1921

= Dolbina exacta =

Species of moth

Dolbina exacta, the exact grizzled hawkmoth, is a species of moth of the family Sphingidae.

== Distribution ==
It is found from the southern part of the Russian Far East, Japan and the Korean Peninsula, south into China as far as Sichuan, Hubei and Zhejiang.

== Description ==
The wingspan is 55–58 mm.

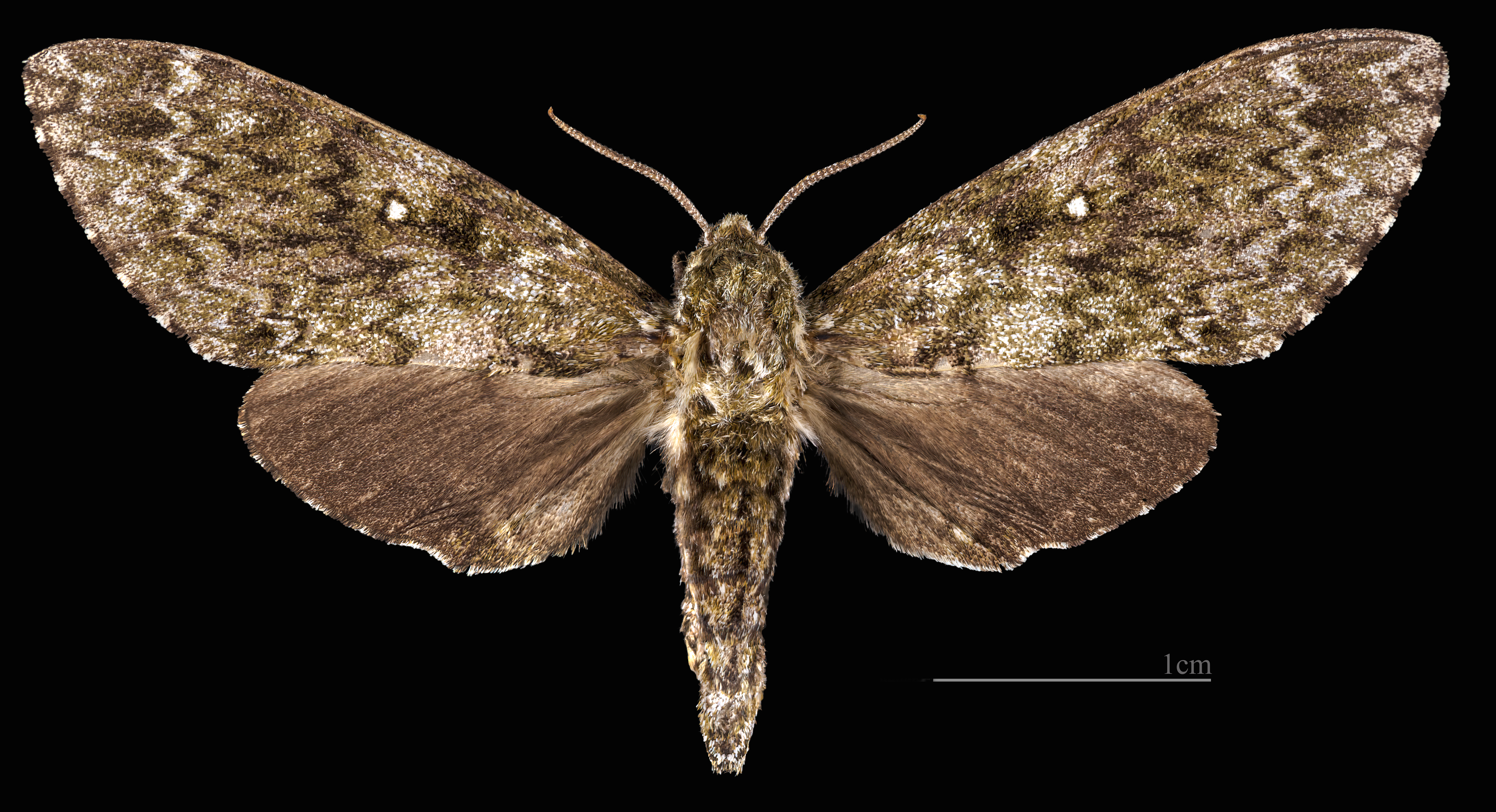
Dolbina exacta ♀

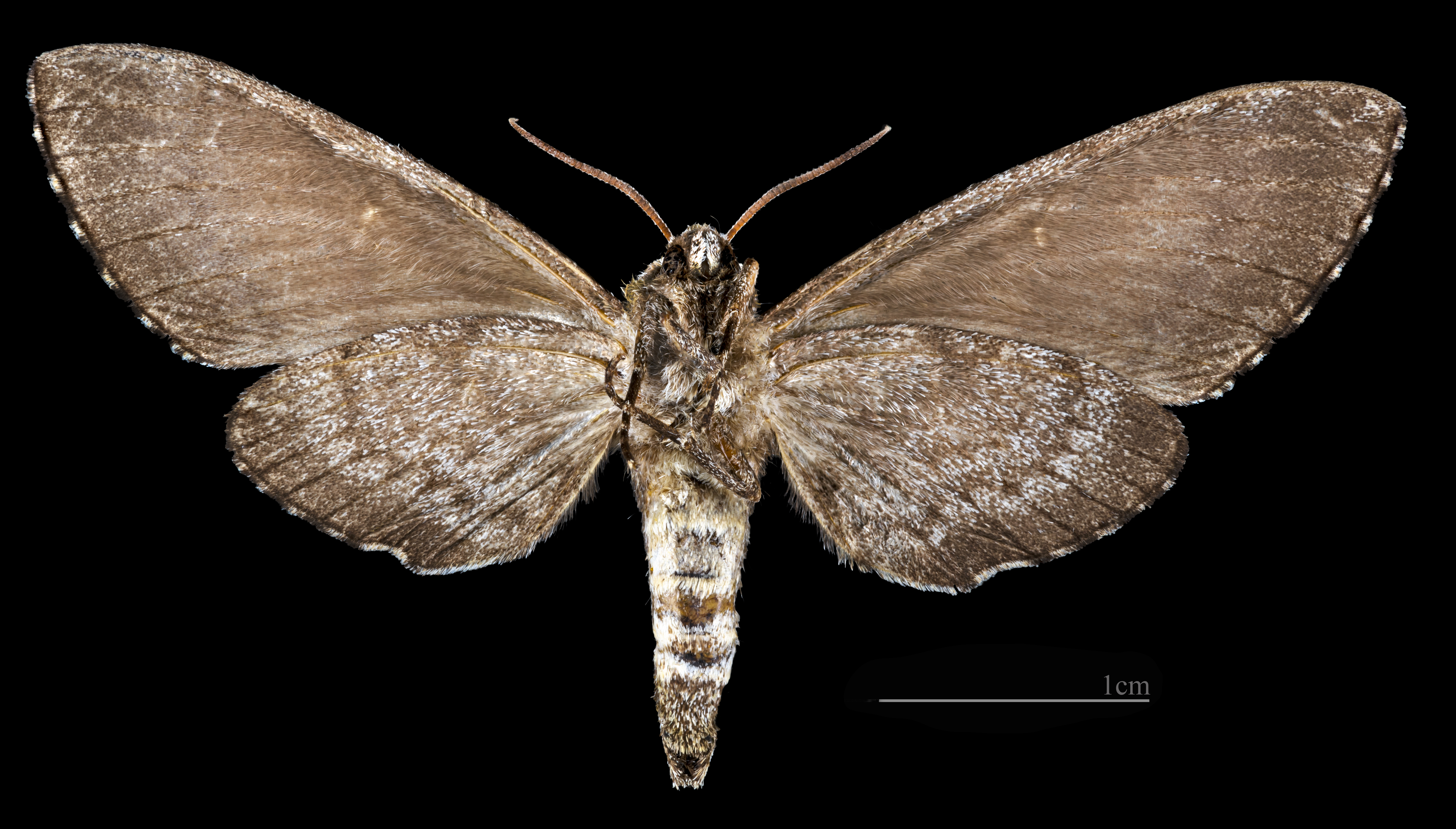
Dolbina exacta ♀ △

== Biology ==
The habitat consists of open parklands and forest edges. Adults are on wing from mid-April to late August in Korea.

The larvae have been recorded feeding on Fraxinus in China, Fraxinus (including Fraxinus mandshurica) and Syringa amurensis in the Russian Far East, Fraxinus lanuginosa in Japan and Ligustrum obtusifolium, Syringa reticulata and Fraxinus rhynchophylla in Korea.
