= Dolbina luzonensis =

Scientific classification
- Kingdom: Animalia
- Phylum: Arthropoda
- Class: Insecta
- Order: Lepidoptera
- Family: Sphingidae
- Genus: Dolbina
- Species: D. luzonensis

Binomial name
- Dolbina luzonensis Brechlin, 2009

Species of moth

Dolbina luzonensis is a species of moth of the family Sphingidae. It is known from the Philippines.
