= Metriochroa psychotriella =

Scientific classification
- Domain: Eukaryota
- Kingdom: Animalia
- Phylum: Arthropoda
- Class: Insecta
- Order: Lepidoptera
- Family: Gracillariidae
- Genus: Metriochroa
- Species: M. psychotriella

Binomial name
- Metriochroa psychotriella Busck, 1900

Synonyms
- Metriochroa psychotriatella Dyar, [1903]

Species of moth

Metriochroa psychotriella is a moth of the family Gracillariidae. It is known from Florida, United States.

The larvae feed on Psychotria nervosa and Psychotria undata. They mine the leaves of their host plant.
