= Metriochroa syringae =

Scientific classification
- Kingdom: Animalia
- Phylum: Arthropoda
- Class: Insecta
- Order: Lepidoptera
- Family: Gracillariidae
- Genus: Metriochroa
- Species: M. syringae

Binomial name
- Metriochroa syringae Kumata, 1998

Species of moth

Metriochroa syringae is a moth of the family Gracillariidae. It is known from Hokkaido island in Japan.

The wingspan is 5.6-6.5 mm.

The larvae feed on Syringa reticulata. They mine the leaves of their host plant.
