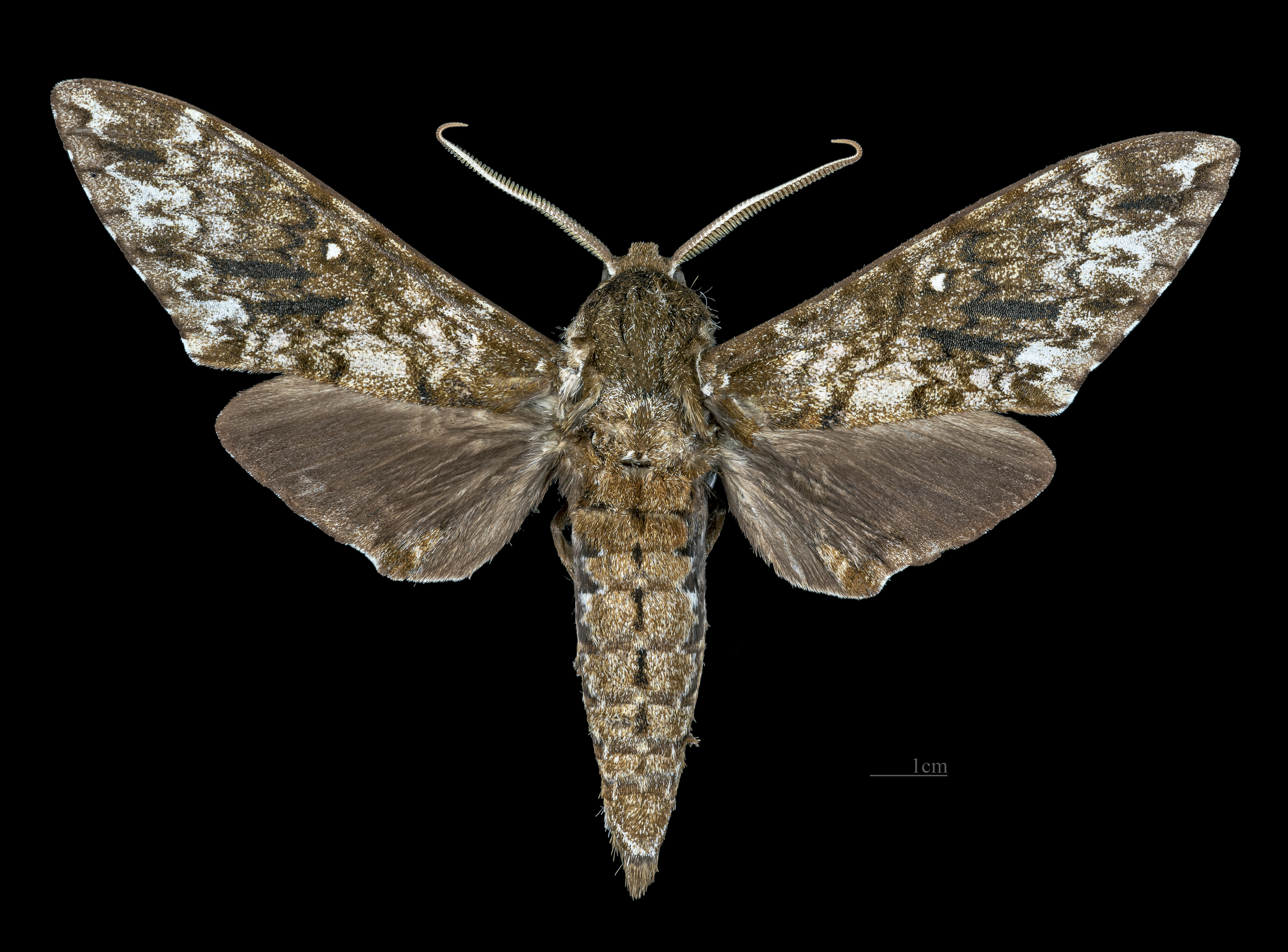

Scientific classification
- Domain: Eukaryota
- Kingdom: Animalia
- Phylum: Arthropoda
- Class: Insecta
- Order: Lepidoptera
- Family: Sphingidae
- Genus: Dolbina
- Species: D. formosana

Binomial name
- Dolbina formosana Matsumura, 1927

= Dolbina formosana =

Species of moth

Dolbina formosana is a species of moth of the family Sphingidae. It is known from Taiwan.
