= Dolbina krikkeni =

Scientific classification
- Kingdom: Animalia
- Phylum: Arthropoda
- Clade: Pancrustacea
- Class: Insecta
- Order: Lepidoptera
- Family: Sphingidae
- Genus: Dolbina
- Species: D. krikkeni

Binomial name
- Dolbina krikkeni Roesler & Kuppers, 1975

Species of moth

Dolbina krikkeni is a species of moth of the family Sphingidae. It is known from Sumatra.
