= Metriochroa scotinopa =

Scientific classification
- Kingdom: Animalia
- Phylum: Arthropoda
- Class: Insecta
- Order: Lepidoptera
- Family: Gracillariidae
- Genus: Metriochroa
- Species: M. scotinopa

Binomial name
- Metriochroa scotinopa Vári, 1963

Species of moth

Metriochroa scotinopa is a moth of the family Gracillariidae. It is known from Ethiopia.

The larvae feed on Dregea schimperi. They probably mine the leaves of their host plant.
