= Metriochroa argyrocelis =

Scientific classification
- Kingdom: Animalia
- Phylum: Arthropoda
- Class: Insecta
- Order: Lepidoptera
- Family: Gracillariidae
- Genus: Metriochroa
- Species: M. argyrocelis

Binomial name
- Metriochroa argyrocelis Vári, 1961

Species of moth

Metriochroa argyrocelis is a moth of the family Gracillariidae. It is known from Zimbabwe.

The larvae feed on Impatiens sylvicola. They mine the leaves of their host plant.
