= Metriochroa carissae =

Scientific classification
- Kingdom: Animalia
- Phylum: Arthropoda
- Class: Insecta
- Order: Lepidoptera
- Family: Gracillariidae
- Genus: Metriochroa
- Species: M. carissae

Binomial name
- Metriochroa carissae Vári, 1963

Species of moth

Metriochroa carissae is a moth of the family Gracillariidae. It is known from Ethiopia.

The larvae feed on Carissa edulis. They mine the leaves of their host plant.
