= Dolbina borneensis =

Scientific classification
- Kingdom: Animalia
- Phylum: Arthropoda
- Class: Insecta
- Order: Lepidoptera
- Family: Sphingidae
- Genus: Dolbina
- Species: D. borneensis

Binomial name
- Dolbina borneensis Brechlin, 2009

Species of moth

Dolbina borneensis is a species of moth of the family Sphingidae. It is known from Malaysia, Thailand and Borneo.
