= Metriochroa tylophorae =

Scientific classification
- Domain: Eukaryota
- Kingdom: Animalia
- Phylum: Arthropoda
- Class: Insecta
- Order: Lepidoptera
- Family: Gracillariidae
- Genus: Metriochroa
- Species: M. tylophorae

Binomial name
- Metriochroa tylophorae Vári, 1961

Species of moth

Metriochroa tylophorae is a moth of the family Gracillariidae. It is known from South Africa.

The larvae feed on Tylophora cordata. They probably mine the leaves of their host plant.
