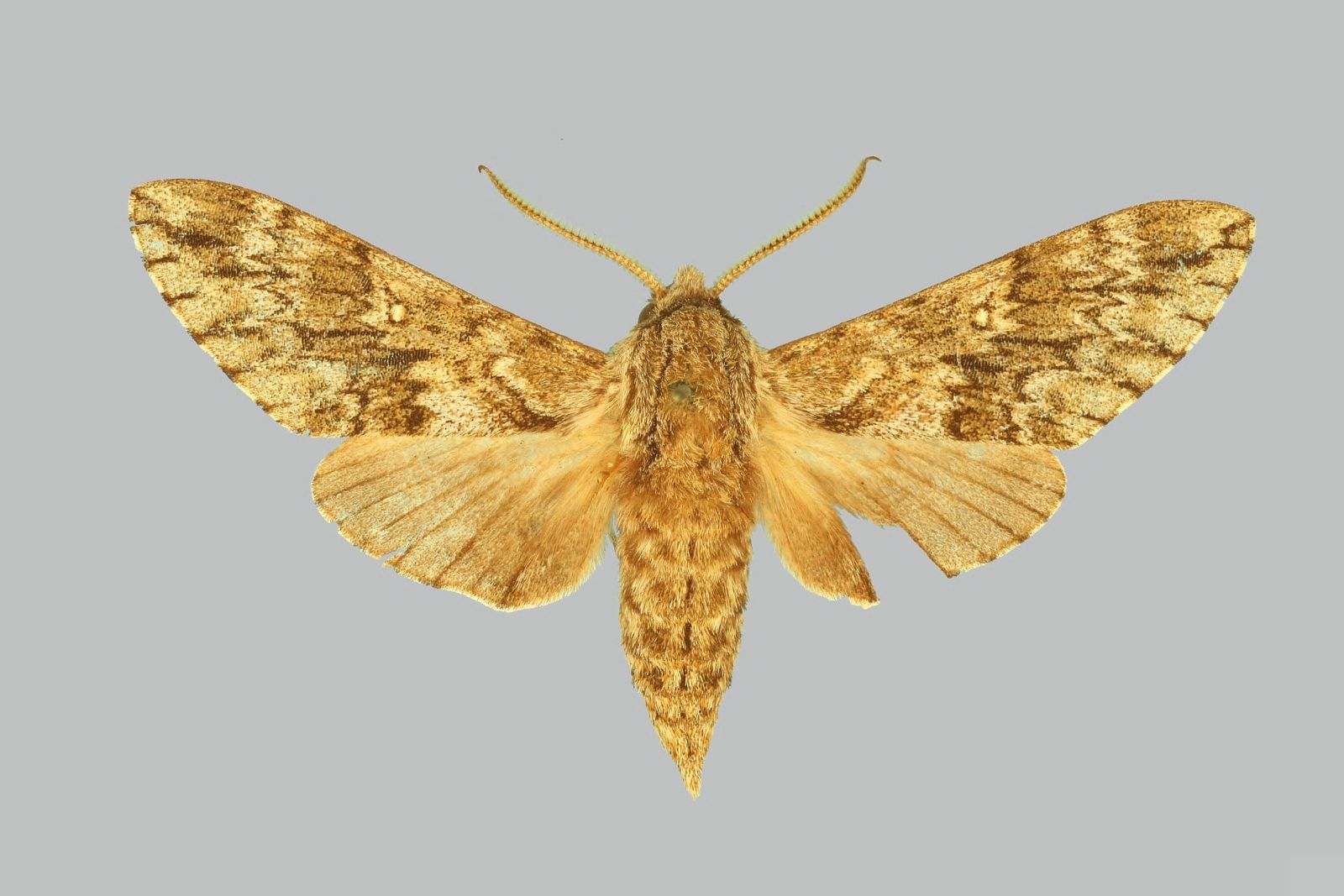
- Male, upperside, India, Kulu

Scientific classification
- Domain: Eukaryota
- Kingdom: Animalia
- Phylum: Arthropoda
- Class: Insecta
- Order: Lepidoptera
- Family: Sphingidae
- Genus: Dolbina
- Species: D. grisea

Binomial name
- Dolbina grisea (Hampson, 1893)

Synonyms
- Pseudosphinx grisea Hampson, 1893; Dolbina grisea hackeri Eitschberger, Danner & Surholt, 1998

= Dolbina grisea =

Mountain hawkmoth

Species of moth

Dolbina grisea, the mountain hawkmoth, is a moth of the family Sphingidae. The species was first described by George Hampson in 1893. It is known from northern Pakistan, Kashmir, eastern Afghanistan, Tajikistan and the western Gissar Mountains of southern Uzbekistan. The habitat consists of light, temperate montane forest, including juniper woodland.

The wingspan is 50–64 mm. Adults are on wing in early April, from early June to August, and (sometimes) from late September to early October. There are two or three generations per year.

The larvae have been recorded feeding on Fraxinus potamophila in Tajikistan.
