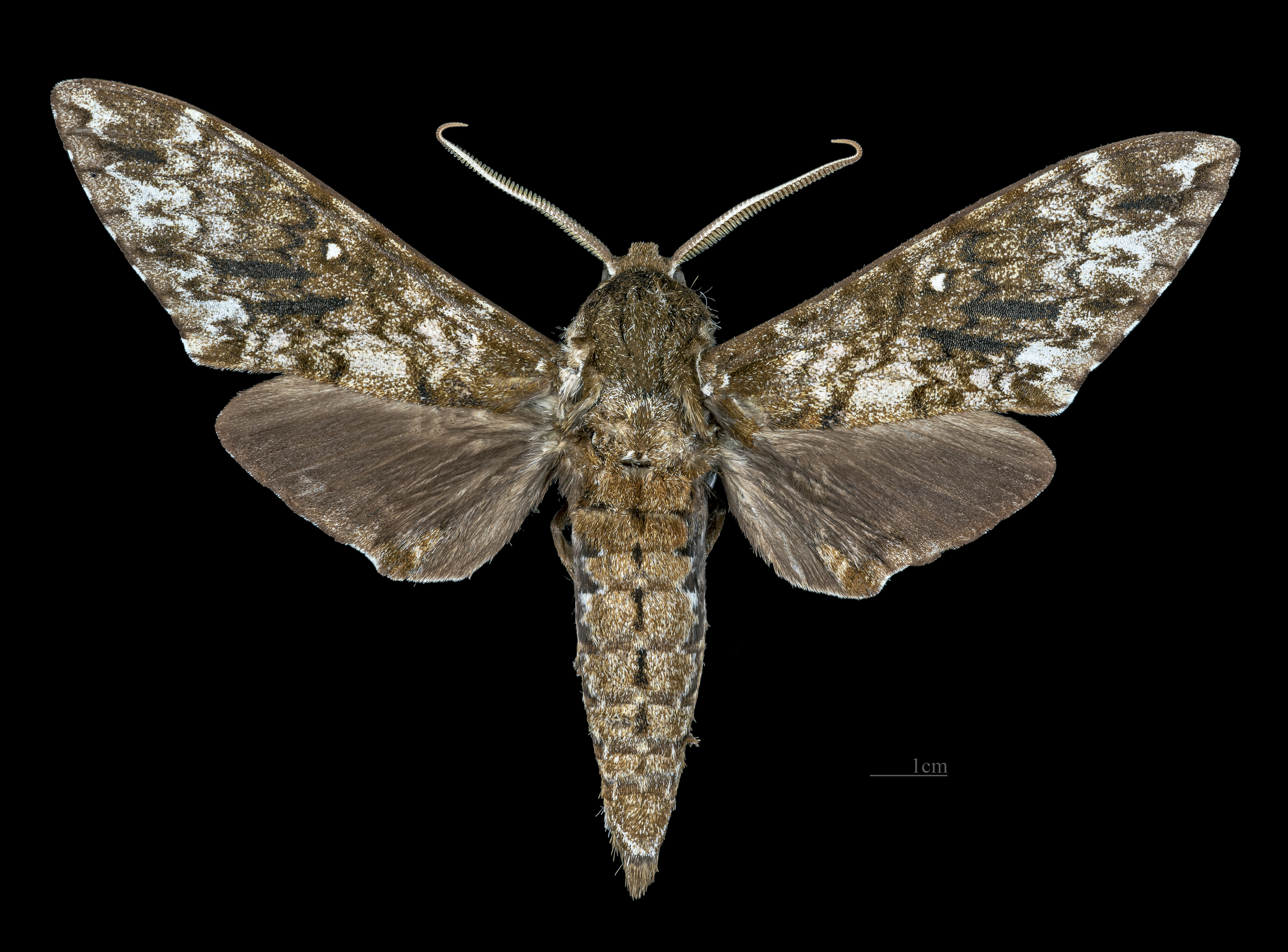
- Dolbina inexacta

Scientific classification
- Kingdom: Animalia
- Phylum: Arthropoda
- Class: Insecta
- Order: Lepidoptera
- Family: Sphingidae
- Tribe: Sphingulini
- Genus: Dolbina; Staudinger, 1877

Synonyms
- Dolbinopsis Rothschild & Jordan, 1903; Elegodolba Eitschberger & Zolotuhin, 1997

= Dolbina =

Genus of moths

Dolbina is a genus of moths in the family Sphingidae. The genus was erected by Otto Staudinger in 1877.

== Species ==
- Dolbina borneensis Brechlin, 2009
- Dolbina elegans Bang-Haas 1912
- Dolbina exacta Staudinger 1892
- Dolbina formosana Matsumura, 1927
- Dolbina grisea (Hampson 1893)
- Dolbina inexacta (Walker 1856)
- Dolbina krikkeni Roesler & Kuppers 1975
- Dolbina luzonensis Brechlin, 2009
- Dolbina mindanaensis Brechlin, 2009
- Dolbina paraexacta Brechlin, 2009
- Dolbina schnitzleri Cadiou 1997
- Dolbina tancrei Staudinger 1887
