= Ligustrum pricei =

Conservation status
- Data Deficient (IUCN 2.3)

Scientific classification
- Kingdom: Plantae
- Clade: Tracheophytes
- Clade: Angiosperms
- Clade: Eudicots
- Clade: Asterids
- Order: Lamiales
- Family: Oleaceae
- Genus: Ligustrum
- Species: L. pricei

Binomial name
- Ligustrum pricei Hayata

Synonyms
- Ligustrum japonicum var. pricei (Hayata) T.S.Liu & J.C.Liao; Ligustrum formosanum Rehder in C.S.Sargent; Ligustrum pedunculare Rehder in C.S.Sargent; Ligustrum seisuiense T.Shimizu & M.T.Kao

Species of flowering plant

Ligustrum pricei is a species of Ligustrum, native to China (Guizhou, Hubei, Hunan, Shaanxi, Sichuan) and Taiwan, where it occurs at 900–1700 m altitude.

Ligustrum pricei is an evergreen shrub or small tree growing to 1–8 m tall. The leaves are 1.5–6 cm long and 1.5–6 cm broad, with an acute apex and an entire margin. The flowers are white, 6–8 mm diameter, produced in panicles 2–7 cm long.

== Medicinal uses ==
A potential analgesic and anti-inflammatory plant.

== Etymology ==
Ligustrum means 'binder'. It was named by Pliny and Virgil.
