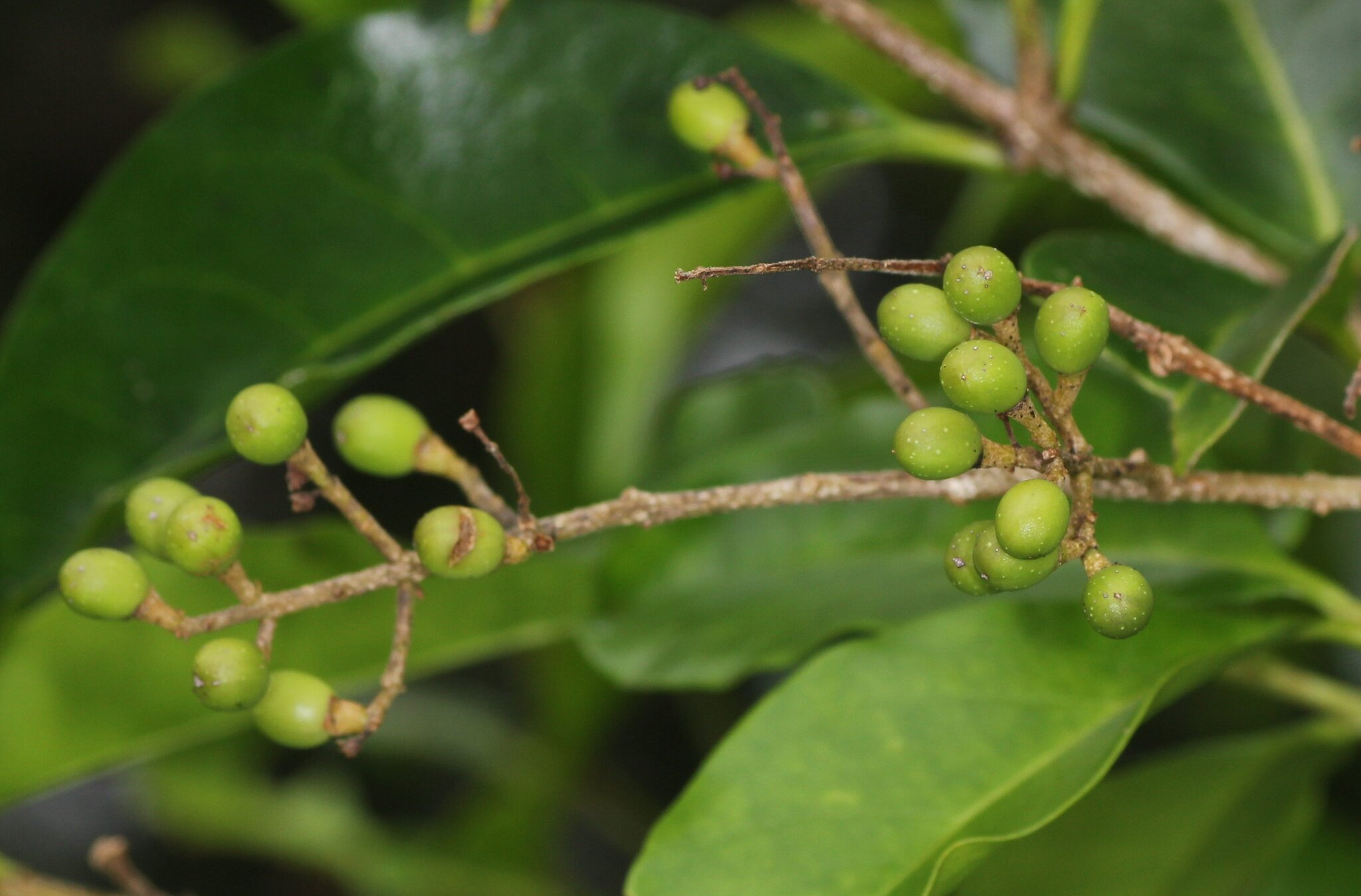
- In Timor-Leste

Conservation status
- Least Concern (IUCN 3.1)

Scientific classification
- Kingdom: Plantae
- Clade: Embryophytes
- Clade: Tracheophytes
- Clade: Angiosperms
- Clade: Eudicots
- Clade: Asterids
- Order: Lamiales
- Family: Oleaceae
- Genus: Ligustrum
- Species: L. glomeratum

Binomial name
- Ligustrum glomeratum Blume

Synonyms
- Ligustrum obtusiusculum Blume; Ligustrum paniculatum Blume; Ligustrum pubinerve Blume; Ligustrum racemosum Noronha; Phillyrea robusta Blume; Visiania glomerata (Blume) Miq.; Visiania phyllothyrsa Miq.; Visiania pubinervis (Blume) Miq.; Visiania sumatrana Miq.

= Ligustrum glomeratum =

Species of flowering plant

Ligustrum glomeratum is a plant in the family Oleaceae. The specific epithet glomeratum means 'gathered closely', referring to the flowers.

== Description ==
Ligustrum glomeratum grows as a shrub or small tree up to 15 m (50 ft) tall. The twigs are pale brown. Its fragrant flowers are white or yellow. The fruit ripens to dark purple.

== Distribution and habitat ==
Ligustrum glomeratum is native to Peninsular Malaysia, Singapore, the Andaman & Nicobar Islands, Sumatra, Java, the Lesser Sunda Islands, the Philippines, Christmas Island, and New Guinea. Its habitat is mixed dipterocarp forest to 1,600 m (5,000 ft) elevation.

== Etymology ==
Ligustrum means 'binder'. It was named by Pliny and Virgil.
