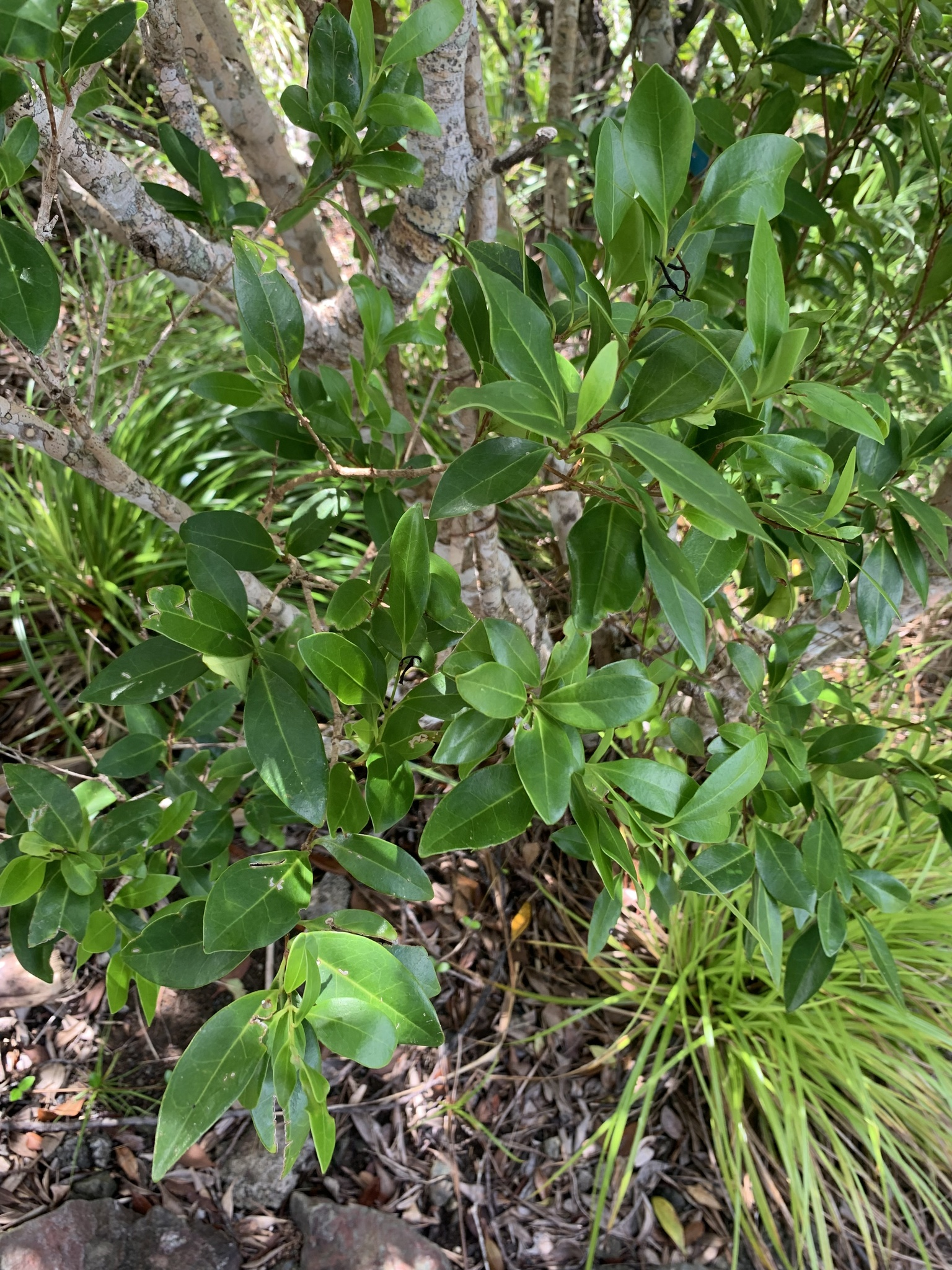

Scientific classification
- Kingdom: Plantae
- Clade: Tracheophytes
- Clade: Angiosperms
- Clade: Eudicots
- Clade: Asterids
- Order: Lamiales
- Family: Oleaceae
- Genus: Ligustrum
- Species: L. micranthum

Binomial name
- Ligustrum micranthum Zucc.

= Ligustrum micranthum =

Species of flowering plant

Ligustrum micranthum is a species of flowering plant in the family Oleaceae, native to the Bonin Islands and the Volcano Islands, both belonging to Japan.

== Etymology ==
Ligustrum means ‘binder’. It was named by Pliny and Virgil.
