= Ligustrum expansum =

Scientific classification
- Kingdom: Plantae
- Clade: Tracheophytes
- Clade: Angiosperms
- Clade: Eudicots
- Clade: Asterids
- Order: Lamiales
- Family: Oleaceae
- Genus: Ligustrum
- Species: L. expansum

Binomial name
- Ligustrum expansum Rehder in C.S.Sargent

Synonyms
- Ligustrum thibeticum Decne.; Ligustrum purpurascens Y.C.Yang; Ligustrum robustum subsp. chinense P.S.Green

Species of flowering plant

Ligustrum expansum is a plant species native to China and Vietnam. The Flora of China lists Ligustrum robustum subsp. chinense P.S.Green as a separate taxon, but more recent sources regard this name as a synonym of L. expansum. Combining the two listings yields a distribution within China including the provinces of Anhui, Fujian, Guangdong, Guangxi, Guizhou, Hubei, Hunan, Jiangxi, Sichuan, and Yunnan.

== Etymology ==
Ligustrum means ‘binder’. It was named by Pliny and Virgil.
