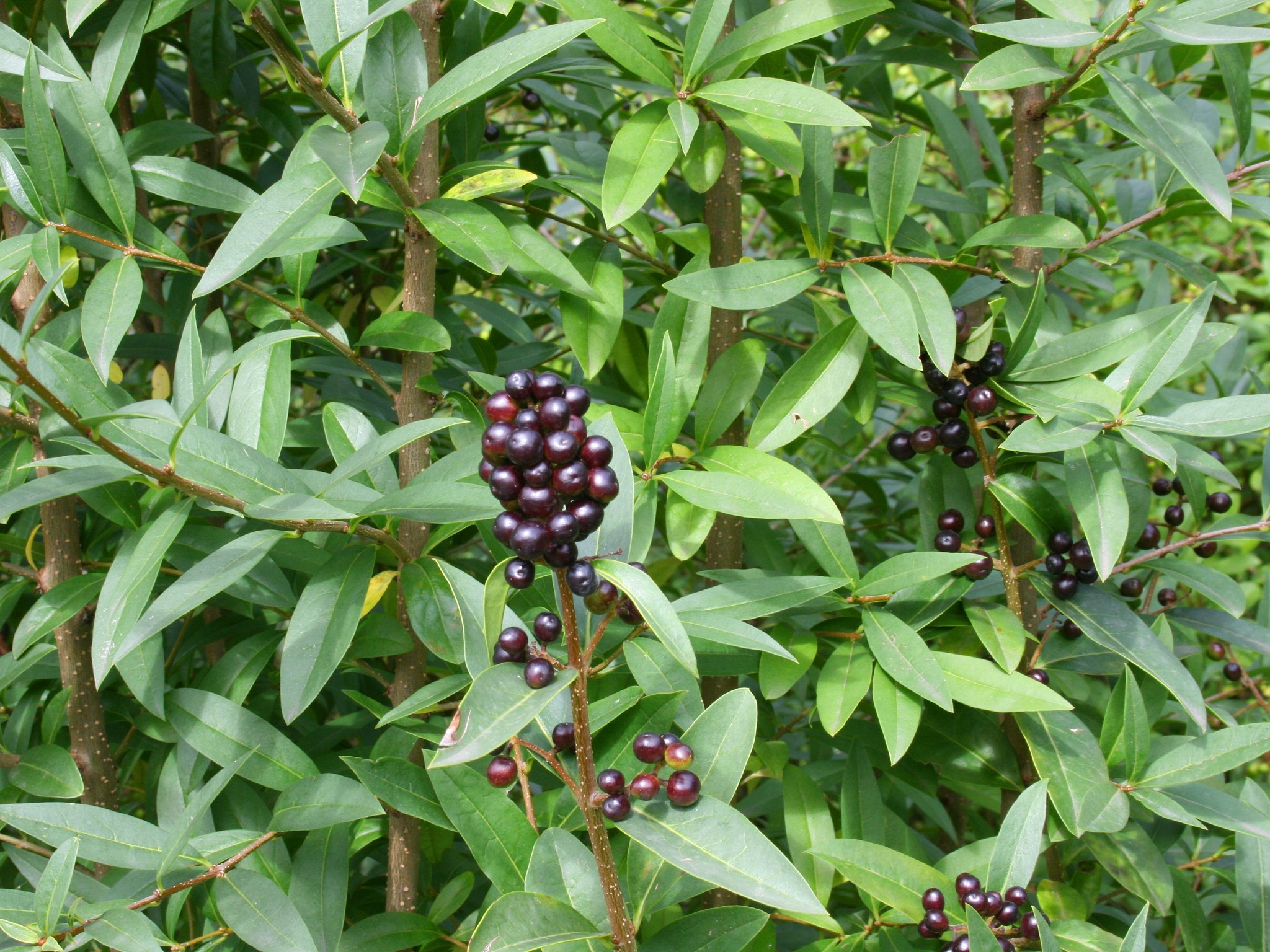
- Ligustrum vulgare

Scientific classification
- Kingdom: Plantae
- Clade: Tracheophytes
- Clade: Angiosperms
- Clade: Eudicots
- Clade: Asterids
- Order: Lamiales
- Family: Oleaceae
- Tribe: Oleeae
- Subtribe: Ligustrinae
- Genus: Ligustrum; L.

Species
- See text

= Privet =

Genus of flowering plants

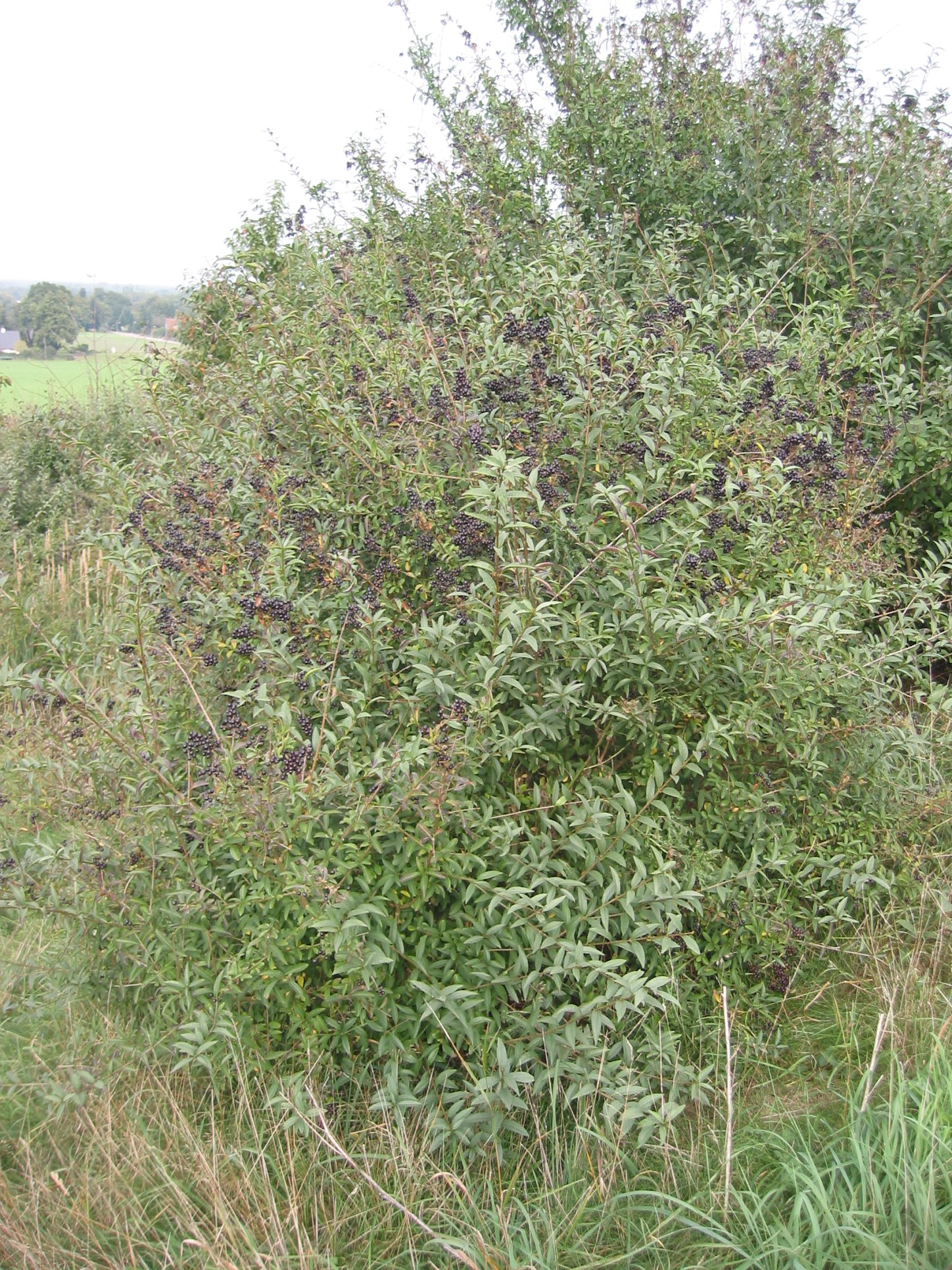
Wild privet, also sometimes known as common privet or European privet (Ligustrum vulgare)

A privet is a flowering plant in the genus Ligustrum. The genus contains about 50 species of erect, deciduous or evergreen shrubs or trees, with a native distribution from Europe to tropical and subtropical Asia, and with one species each native to Australia and north Africa. Some species have become widely naturalized or invasive where introduced. Privet was originally the name for the European semi-evergreen shrub Ligustrum vulgare, and later also for the more reliably evergreen Ligustrum ovalifolium and its hybrid Ligustrum × ibolium used extensively for privacy hedging, though now the name is applied to all members of the genus. The generic name was applied by Pliny the Elder (23–79 AD) to L. vulgare. It is often suggested that the name privet is related to private, but the Oxford English Dictionary states that there is no evidence to support this.

== Description ==
Privet is a group of shrubs and small trees of southern and eastern Asia, from the Himalayas extending into Australia. They may be evergreen or deciduous, and are tolerant of different soil types. They often have conspicuous heads of white flowers followed by black berries.

Privet (Ligustrum) is a genus of shrubs commonly used for hedges, borders and garden landscaping. These plants are valued for their adaptability and their ability to tolerate regular pruning. Privet can also be propagated from softwood cuttings taken during the growing season.

== Uses and cultivation ==
In addition to being cultivated to create ornamental hedges and foliage, privet is also widely used in horticulture and flower arrangements. The oval leaf privet Ligustrum ovalifolium is used for hedges, while its flexible twigs are sometimes used as cords for lashing. The tree species, especially Chinese privet is frequently used as a street tree in Europe, while other species including Ligustrum japonicum and Ligustrum quihoui are among the others also sometimes used as ornamental plants in gardens. Privet became very popular in Britain as a replacement for ornamental railings around properties, which had been lost to the 1941 UK government's requisitioning of, with few exceptions, all post-1850 iron gates and railings for the war effort. The government had the intention of melting down the donated metal for use in the manufacture of armaments in WWII, although it is not certain how much of the metal was actually used. The remaining stubs of sawn-off railings can still be seen on many garden walls in the UK, often partly obscured by privet bushes.

Chinese privet is used in traditional herbal medicine. The decoction of privet leaves or bark helps to treat diarrhea, stomach ulcers, chronic bowel problems, chapped lips, sore mouths and throats, and a wash for skin problems. Privet leaves and bark have bitter properties that make a useful tea for improving appetite and digestion in chemotherapy patients. Kuding is a Chinese tea made from either a Ligustrum or Ilex species.

Some species produce a fruit, which is mildly toxic to humans. Symptoms from eating privet fruit include nausea, headache, abdominal pain, vomiting, diarrhea, weakness, low blood pressure, and low body temperature. At least some privet species are known to be toxic to horses.

== Ecology ==
A plant may produce thousands of fruits, most of which are eaten by birds. Privet is used as a food plant by the larvae of some moth species including the common emerald, common marbled carpet, copper underwing, engrailed, mottled beauty, scalloped hazel, small angle shades, v-pug, privet hawk moth and willow beauty.

=== Invasiveness ===
Privet is a successful invasive species because of its ability to outcompete and therefore displace native vegetation, due to its adaptability. Various species are now a problem in North America, Australia and New Zealand.

== Species ==
As of April 2025 Plants of the World Online lists 46 accepted species of Ligustrum.

- Ligustrum angustum B.M.Miao
- Ligustrum australianum F.Muell.
- Ligustrum compactum (Wall. ex G.Don) Hook.f. & Thomson ex Brandis
- Ligustrum confusum Decne.
- Ligustrum cumingianum Decne.
- Ligustrum delavayanum Har.
- Ligustrum expansum Rehder
- Ligustrum fengjieense Xian Y.Li & Si Y.Zeng
- Ligustrum foliosum Nakai
- Ligustrum glomeratum Blume
- Ligustrum gracile Rehder
- Ligustrum guangdongense R.J.Wang & H.Z.Wen
- Ligustrum henryi Hemsl.
- Ligustrum ibota Siebold
- Ligustrum japonicum Thunb.
- Ligustrum leucanthum (S.Moore) P.S.Green
- Ligustrum lianum P.S.Hsu
- Ligustrum lindleyi (Wall. ex G.Don) P.S.Green
- Ligustrum liukiuense Koidz.
- Ligustrum lucidum W.T.Aiton
- Ligustrum micranthum Zucc.
- Ligustrum minii Raizada
- Ligustrum morrisonense Kaneh. & Sasaki
- Ligustrum myrsinites Decne.
- Ligustrum nepalense Wall.
- Ligustrum novoguineense Lingelsh.
- Ligustrum obovatilimbum B.M.Miao
- Ligustrum obtusifolium Siebold & Zucc.
- Ligustrum ovalifolium Hassk.
- Ligustrum parvifolium Kiew
- Ligustrum pricei Hayata
- Ligustrum punctifolium M.C.Chang
- Ligustrum quihoui Carrière
- Ligustrum retusum Merr.
- Ligustrum robustum (Roxb.) Blume
- Ligustrum salicinum Nakai
- Ligustrum sempervirens (Franch.) Lingelsh.
- Ligustrum sinense Lour.
- Ligustrum stenophyllum Quisumb. & Merr.
- Ligustrum strongylophyllum Hemsl.
- Ligustrum tamakii Hatus.
- Ligustrum tenuipes M.C.Chang
- Ligustrum tschonoskii Decne.
- Ligustrum undulatum Blume
- Ligustrum vulgare L.
- Ligustrum xingrenense D.J.Liu
