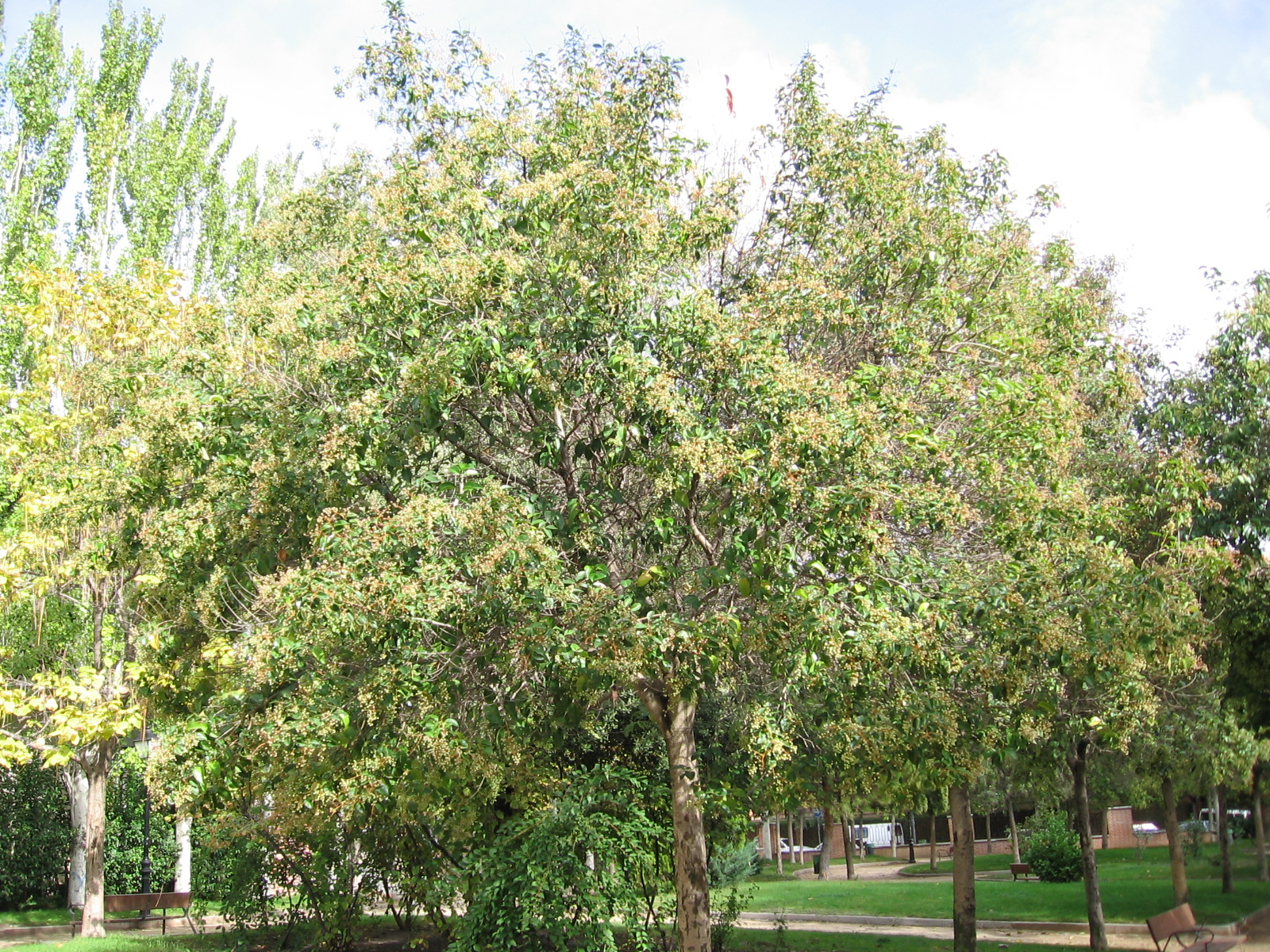

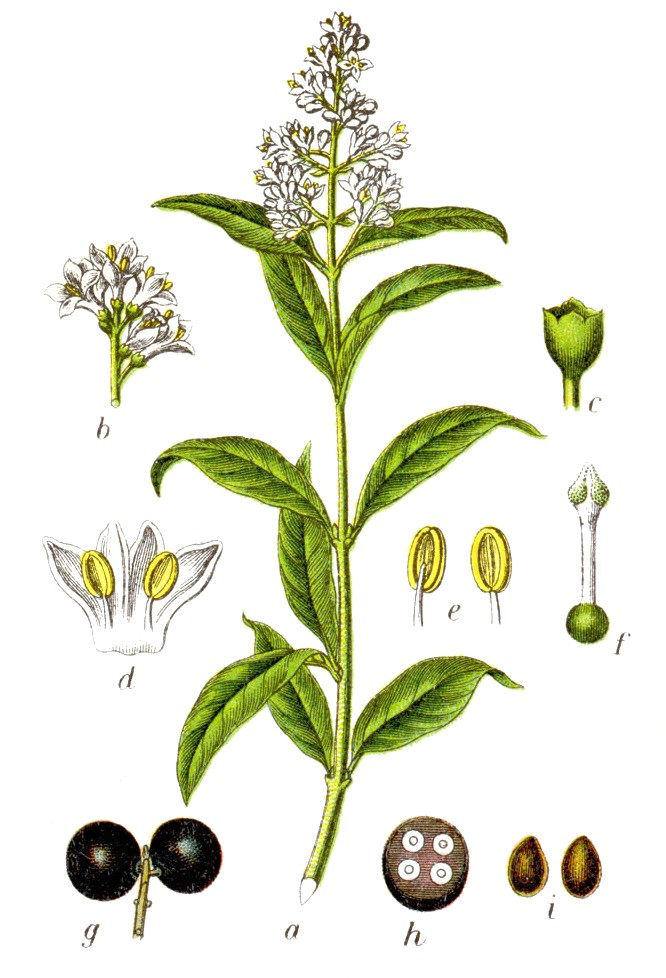
- Figure from Sturm 1796; Deutschlands Flora in Abbildungen

Scientific classification
- Kingdom: Plantae
- Clade: Tracheophytes
- Clade: Angiosperms
- Clade: Eudicots
- Clade: Asterids
- Order: Lamiales
- Family: Oleaceae
- Genus: Ligustrum
- Species: L. japonicum

Binomial name
- Ligustrum japonicum Thunb.

= Ligustrum japonicum =

Species of flowering plant

Ligustrum japonicum, known as wax-leaf privet or Japanese privet (Japanese: ネズミモチ) is a species of Ligustrum (privet) native to central and southern Japan (Honshū, Shikoku, Kyūshū, Okinawa) and Korea. It is widely cultivated in other regions, and is naturalized in California and in the southeastern United States from Texas to Virginia.

== Description ==
Ligustrum japonicum inflorescences

L. japonicum is an evergreen shrub or small tree growing to 2–5 meters (6 ft 7 in – 16 ft 5 in)—rarely 6 meters (20 ft)—tall, with smooth, pale grey-brown bark on the stems. The leaves are opposite, 5–10 cm long and 2–5 cm broad, glossy dark green above, paler glaucous to yellowish green below, thick and leathery textured, and with an entire margin. The flowers are white, with a four-lobed corolla 5–6 mm long; they are borne in clusters 7–15 cm long in early summer. The fruit is an oval drupe, 10 mm long, ripening purple-black with a glaucous waxy bloom in early winter; in Japan they are popularly likened to mouse or rat droppings. The species is closely related to the Chinese Ligustrum lucidum, differing in its smaller size (L. lucidum making a tree to over 10 m tall), and elongated oval (not subglobose) fruit. Flowering occurs in early spring, with occasional repeat blooms in summer, early autumn, or both. The fruit ripens in autumn. The plant grows in sun or shade, damp, disturbed, or undisturbed areas, commonly found in floodplain forests, wetlands, and pine flatwoods.

Japanese Privet is native to Japan and Eastern Asia and was introduced to the United States from Japan and Korea in 1845. Ligustrum japonicum is commonly used as ornamental in many parts of the world. They are valued by their evergreen leaves, white flowers, adaptability to different ranges of landscape conditions, pruning, resistance to diseases, and wide availability. Some Ligustrum species have escaped cultivation and become naturalized in natural areas. For example, sixteen countries report the naturalization of Chinese privet. In the United States, Chinese privet has been established in 20 states and it's considered invasive. Exotic plant invasion is considered one of the main causes of the degradation of ecosystems and loss of biodiversity globally.

== Cultivation and uses ==
Lingustrum japonicum arrived in North America in 1845 from Japan and Korea. It has become an invasive plant, particularly in the American South as it has escaped from cultivation. It is occasionally grown as an ornamental plant in Europe and North America; several cultivars have been selected for garden use, including 'Rotundifolium' with leaves nearly as broad as long, and 'Silver Star' with creamy-white margins to the leaves. It has spread to various states in the United States due to its use in ornamental horticulture. In Florida, the FLEPPC does not list Ligustrum japonicum as an invasive species but it has escaped cultivation in 11 southeastern states including TX, AR, LA, MS, GA, SC, NC, TN, and PA9. Currently, 11 different species and hybrids from the privet genus are commercially available in the US.

The fruit is used in herbal medicine as a cardiotonic, diuretic, laxative, and tonic treatment. Ligustrum japonicum has different effects on osteogenic and adipogenic cells within the body. By examining the ALP activity and lipid accumulation using human bone marrow derived from stromal cells, an increase of ALP production will be found. The accumulation of intracellular triglycerides are well-known markers of osteoclastogenesis and adipogenesis. The increase in ALP is due to the substances within the fruits of Ligustrum japonicum. Ligustrum japonicum fruits have been used in traditional medicinal practices and supplements in Korea and Japan. It has been reported to have various bioactivities. Which is why Ligustrum japonicum is used for tonic effects in traditional Japanese medicine.
