= Egesta (disambiguation) =

Egesta is the historic Sicilian city Segesta

It may also refer to:

- Stegea, a genus of moths
  - Egesta minutalis, a species in the genus
- Spatalistis egesta, a moth species
- Cymothoe egesta, a moth species
