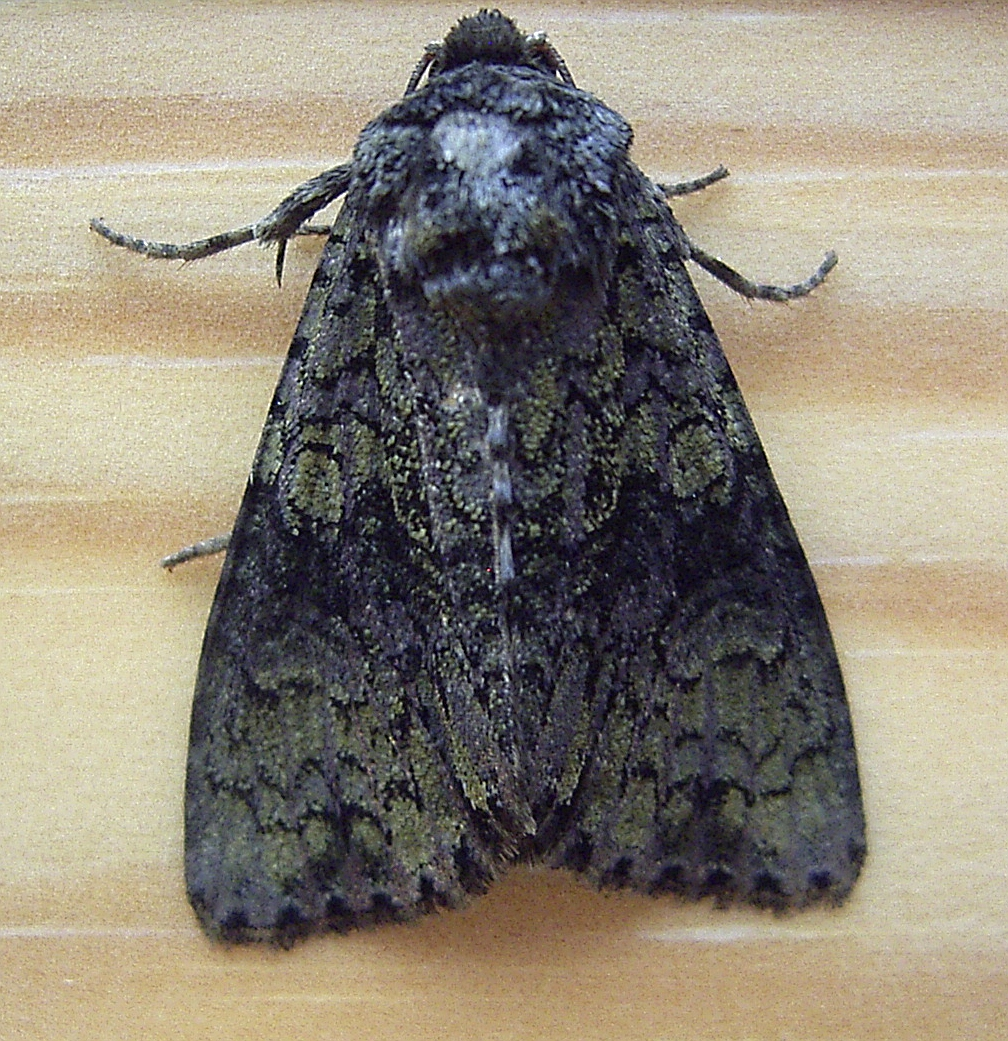

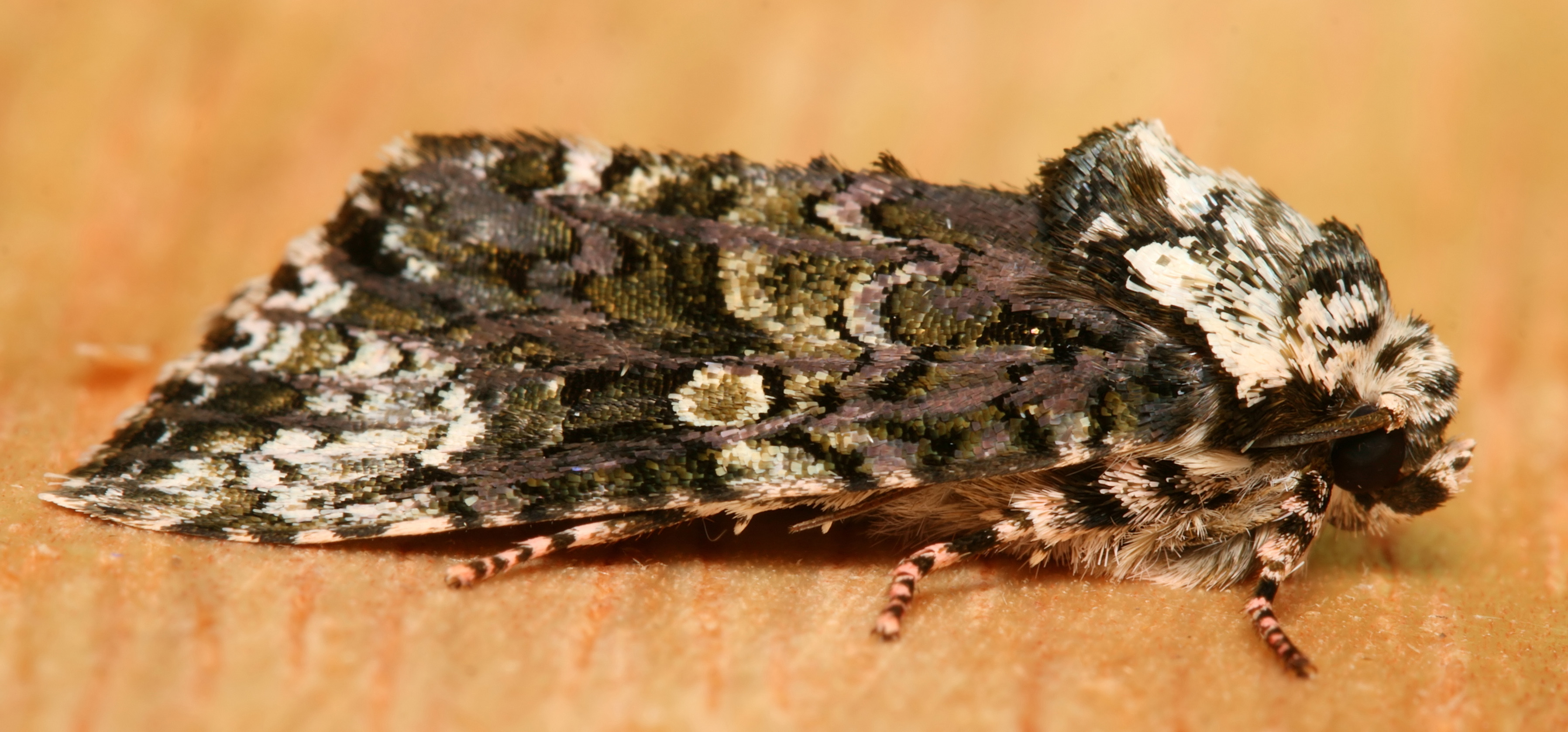

Scientific classification
- Kingdom: Animalia
- Phylum: Arthropoda
- Class: Insecta
- Order: Lepidoptera
- Superfamily: Noctuoidea
- Family: Noctuidae
- Genus: Craniophora
- Species: C. ligustri

Binomial name
- Craniophora ligustri (Denis & Schiffermüller, 1775)

= Craniophora ligustri =

Coronet

Species of moth

Craniophora ligustri, the coronet, is a moth of the family Noctuidae. The species was first described by Michael Denis and Ignaz Schiffermüller in 1775. It is found in Europe, through the Palearctic to Japan.

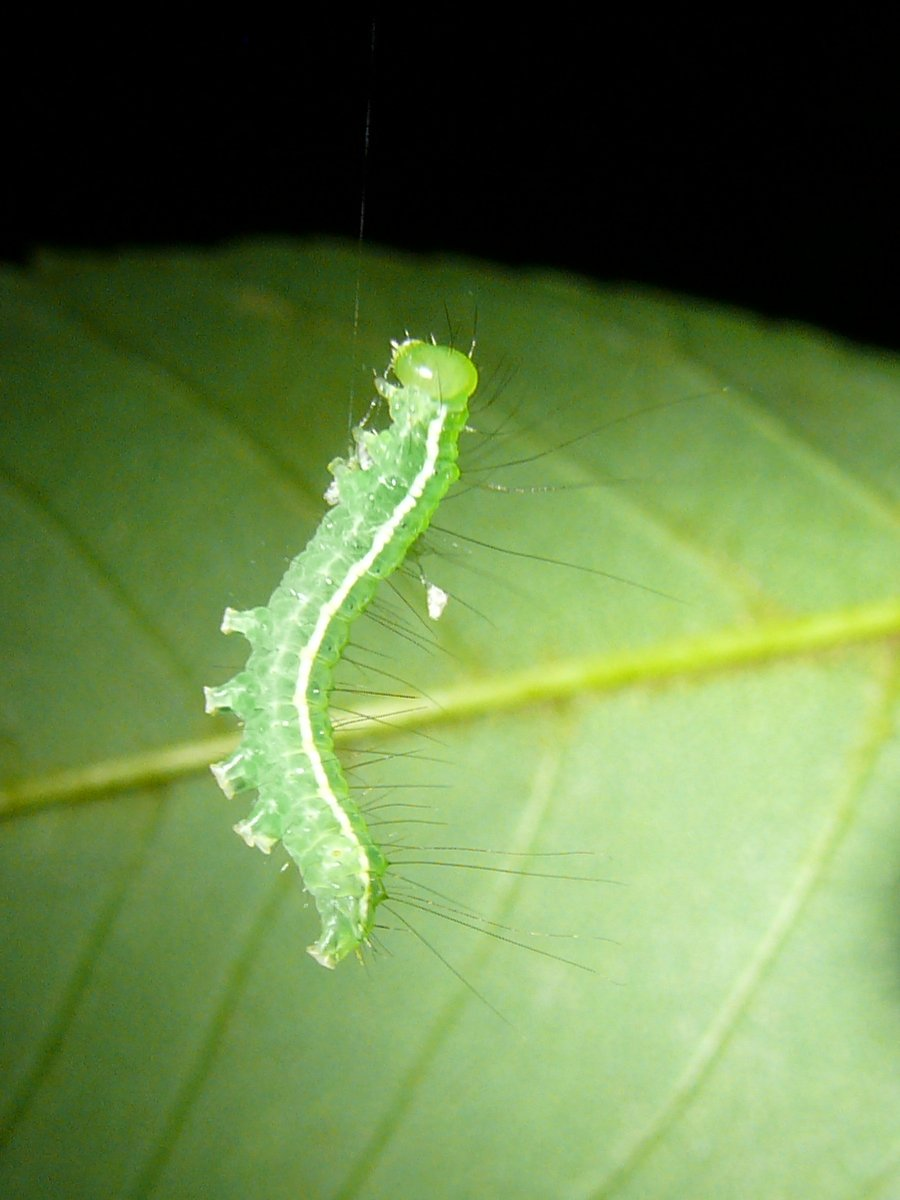
Caterpillar

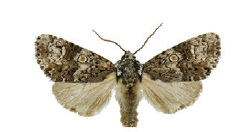
Mounted adult

== Distribution ==
It is found from western and central Europe to the Russian Far East, northern China, Japan and Korea. In the north, the range extends to southern Scandinavia, the Baltic States and central Russia (approximately north to Saint Petersburg) as well as Ukraine. However, on the Iberian Peninsula, the species is limited to the north. In the eastern Mediterranean, it reaches northern Greece with smaller isolated occurrence in central Greece and the Peloponnese. The distribution area also includes Israel, Asia Minor and the Caucasus. It occurs in Cyprus.

== Description ==
The wingspan is 30–35 mm. Its forewings are purplish fuscous, more or less greenish tinged, with a paler patch beyond the cell; prothorax conspicuously whitish. — ab. sundevalli Lampa is a form in which both forewing and thorax are entirely dark olive green. ab. nigra Tutt has the forewing black throughout, without any green tinge, and has only been taken in the North of England; lastly, in ab. coronula Haw. the white apex is suffused with grey brown instead of green, with a white lunule on its inner edge. The white patch distal to the reniform appears to resemble a crown, hence the name coronet. Wing coloration and size is dependent on the environmental factor in which they grow as well as it is expected to be shown through physical differences and morphology.

== Biology ==
The moth flies from April to September depending on the location. The caterpillars feed on Fraxinus excelsior, common lilac and Ligustrum vulgare.
