= Privet as an invasive plant =

Number of shrubs or trees in the genus Ligustrum

Privets are any of a number of shrubs or trees in the genus Ligustrum, many of which are invasive. The genus contains about 50 species native to the Old World and Australasia. Many members of the genus are grown as ornamental plants in parts of the world.

Several species of privet have become a nuisance in regions outside their ranges. In these conditions they are most commonly found wherever there is disturbed soil, soil that is physically perturbed from its natural state through fire or mechanical machinery, such as along fencerows, old fields, ditches, and forest margins. Privet grows particularly well in riparian forests, which are found throughout the Southeastern United States. Although tolerant of varying soil and light conditions, including a tolerance for shade, privet survives best in mesic soil with abundant sunlight.

== Economic and cultural effects ==
Privet is considered a huge problem in New Zealand and the east coast of Australia (Ligustrum lucidum, Ligustrum sinense and Ligustrum vulgare). It is banned from sale or cultivation in New Zealand because its pollen is known to cause asthma and eczema in sufferers. Privet can be removed by contacting local government agencies to report its presence. but in Auckland it is only a surveillance pest plant in the 2012 Regional Pest Management Strategy. The NZ Weedbusters site provides guidance on how to get rid of the plant.

Where privet is an invasive species, the cost of controlling and removing privet is economically detrimental, something that is problematic for conservation efforts. The annual cost of removing Chinese privet in the United States is estimated to be $737 per acre when a mulching machine and two-person herbicide application crew are employed. The cost for foliar glyphosate applications on privet is approximately $130 per acre for chemical and surfactant treatments.

== Invasiveness ==
Privet is a successful invasive species because of its ability to outcompete and therefore displace native vegetation. This competitive superiority to native vegetation is connected with the plant's ability to adapt to different light conditions. For example, in low light environments, privet is able to produce fewer and larger ramets than its competitors. These larger ramets make privet more tree-like, making privet better able to compete for light than its more shrub-like native counterparts. Privet is an ideal invasive species because it reproduces both sexually and asexually. Through sexual reproduction, privet produces seeds that are easily dispersed by wind and animals. These seeds can rapidly colonize disturbed soil such as that perturbed by fires, forest clearings, erosion, or abandoned agricultural land. Privet matures quickly, which allows for a short generation cycle and even greater dispersal. The roots of privet can reproduce asexually through root suckers. This vegetative reproduction makes privet difficult and costly to control because root fragments left in the soil can sprout and grow new plants.

One reason why privet is so invasive in the United States is because it has few native shrub competitors. In a sense, privet is invading and exploiting an open niche within the southern U.S. floodplain ecosystem. Prior to privet invasion much of the native land was clear and open; currently, privet forms a dense thicket which chokes out other, usually native, plant life. Thus, privet is believed to be phylogenetically distinct compared to its native cousins.

== Ecological impact in the U.S. ==
=== Introduction ===
All nine species of privet currently in the southeast U.S. are invasive. The first species of privet was introduced into the United States in the 1700s as an ornamental plant used as a hedge or foliage for gardens. Glossy privet arrived in the U.S. in 1794, Chinese privet in 1825, Japanese privet in 1845, California privet in 1847, and Amur privet in 1860. Privets escaped cultivation in the early 1900s, but became widely naturalized during the 1950s-1970s or later. Currently privet is designated as a foreign invasive plant in Alabama and Georgia and considered a severe threat in North Carolina and Florida. It is estimated that Chinese privet alone occupies over one million hectares of land across 12 states ranging from Virginia to Florida and west to Texas.

The full ecological effect of privet is still being studied. However, data suggest that forests containing large amounts of privet tend to have fewer trees, less shrub diversity, and decreased density of herbaceous plants. When introduced to an ecosystem, privet grows quickly and, given time, will produce a thick layer under the forest canopy preventing sunlight from reaching the native plants below. In some cases, this can drive native populations to extinction. If left unchecked, privet may result in large-scale ecosystem modification and an overall loss of native species diversity and richness. The Sierra Chicas of Cordoba have experienced just such a widespread landscape change since 1970.

In a study by Greene and Blossey using field observations and a transplant experiment, a significant negative correlation was found between percent Chinese privet cover and herbaceous cover, species richness, and plant height. In a comparison of two experimental gardens, each with four native plant species, the plot with Chinese privet contained almost entirely nonnative plants after 64 weeks. Out of approximately twenty plants per species, only single individuals of Acer negundo, Chamaenerion latifolium and C. tribuloides survived the entire study when in the presence of Chinese privet. Surviving plants had lower leaf counts and stunted height relative to their counterparts in privet-absent plots. None of the Boehmeria cylindrica survived.

Insects are greatly affected by the proliferation of invasive species such as privet. For example, one study found the abundance and diversity of butterflies increased following privet removal to almost the same abundance as that of a similar forest community, with no history of privet invasion. In a study conducted in Georgia, privet was found to decrease the diversity of native honeybee colonies. Plots removed of privet resulted in four times as many bee species as control plots in which privet was not removed. Traps placed in undisturbed forest plots with no history of privet caught an average of 210 bees from 34 species, while traps placed in privet-infested plots caught an average of 35 bees from only 9 species.

Another example of how privet can have a negative ecological impact in ecological communities is its ability to threaten endangered species. For example, privet threatens the Miccosukee gooseberry, a native plant species that privet is similar to, by encroaching on the gooseberry's habitat and slowly displacing it.

Biological species invasion is considered a main component of global ecosystem change due to changes in biogeochemical cycles and disturbance regimes. Invasive species such as privet are known to alter the dominant vegetation type, soil properties, animal behavior, and the natural cycling of resources. For example, Chinese privet increases the decomposition rate of leaf litter by 2.6-fold in riparian forests.

However, because the usual method employed to study the impact of privet is to compare invaded and non-invaded areas, available data may be inaccurate. This is because these types of comparison studies have trouble controlling for abiotic and biotic habitat conditions that could be negatively affecting native plant growth.

=== Effect of climate change ===
Evidence suggests that climate changes, brought about by increased CO_{2} concentrations, will increase the spread and proliferation of privet. Climate change is predicted to increase competition between native and invasive plants. Additionally, the increased temperatures that result from climate change are predicted to expand the range of plants typically restricted to the deep south where it is warm and moist. In a projection based on the current and predicted CO_{2} levels, temperature, and precipitation, it was predicted that by the year 2100 privet will have spread as far north as Maine, sweeping across the mid-western United States into Nebraska. Thus, states that are currently free from privet invasion (Michigan, Ohio, Indiana, Illinois, Kentucky, Virginia, Pennsylvania, etc.) are all predicted to become invaded with privet within the next 100 years unless either privet is contained or conservation efforts decrease the effect of pollution on climate change.

== Control and removal methods ==
=== Methods of control ===
The same qualities that allow privet to outcompete native species make it extremely difficult to control and eradicate. Privet is manageable with mowing or cutting consistently, as closely to the ground as possible. This will prevent the spread of the privet but will not eradicate it. Even methods such as controlled burning have proven ineffective and actually aid privet growth because privet recovers better than native plants from controlled burns.

Mechanical removal of privet, especially for younger plants or smaller areas of growth, can be effective; however, all of the root must be removed to prevent root re-sprouting. Mechanical removal can prove difficult for more large-scale invasions. When such large invasions occur in the natural environment, herbicide use is usually avoided due to the negative impacts on native plants. Thus, the use of many workers or heavy machinery such as bulldozers is the most effective option. However, the soil disturbance and resulting erosion are important considerations when using such measures.

When herbicide use is warranted, several methods have proven effective. In all cases, soil disturbance following herbicide treatment is inadvisable. This is due to privet's preference for disturbed soils and its increased ability to compete in such an environment. The length of time that the soil must be left undisturbed varies with the treatment. Foliar applications of glyphosate, cut-stump applications of glyphosate or triclopyr, and basal bark treatments for stems less than 0.5 inches is effective.

The foliar treatments are most effective against dense thickets of privet. The best times for such treatments are in late fall and early spring when many of the native species are dormant. Care must be used with such an application to avoid spraying non-target plants. This treatment is generally considered to be less effective than the cut-stump and basal bark methods.

The cut-stump method is most useful when treating single plants. This method consists of thoroughly covering the stump of a recently cut plant with herbicides, such as glyphosate and triclopyr. The effectiveness of this treatment is increased by cutting a hole into the surface of the stump. This treatment is not recommended when the plant breaks the dormant stage or when the ground is frozen-- it far less effective.

The basal bark treatment consists of application of herbicide to all basal parts of the plant below 12-15 inches. The bark must be thoroughly wet with herbicide for this treatment to be most effective. The USDA suggests that 25% triclopyr and 75% horticultural oil is the most effective herbicide composition for basal bark treatments.

The first known biological control of privet is the privet lace bug (Leptoypha hospita), which has been deployed in New Zealand.

=== Agencies working to control privet ===
The Federal Interagency Committee for the Management of Noxious and Exotic Weeds (FICMNEW) engages with public and private organizations in the effort to combat noxious and exotic weeds, including Chinese and European privet. Privet is monitored by the US Forest Service's Invasive Species Program while the National Park Service deploys Exotic Plant Management Teams. Each team has jurisdiction over ten national parks and works with local volunteers, contractors, and service organizations.

These agencies work to eliminate, contain, and/or remove privet because many areas invaded by privet, such as the Piedmont floodplains, are important areas of biodiversity, carbon storage, and resource production.

== See also ==
- Invasive species in the United States
- Environmental issues in the United States
