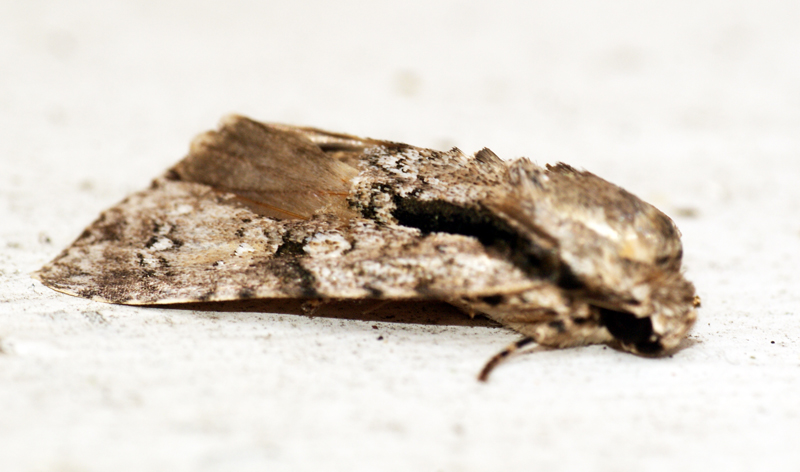

Scientific classification
- Domain: Eukaryota
- Kingdom: Animalia
- Phylum: Arthropoda
- Class: Insecta
- Order: Lepidoptera
- Superfamily: Noctuoidea
- Family: Noctuidae
- Genus: Craniophora
- Species: C. fasciata

Binomial name
- Craniophora fasciata Moore, 1884

Synonyms
- Hyboma fasciata Moore, [1884]; Hyboma divisa Moore, 1888; Acronycta nigrostriata Pagenstecher, 1888

= Craniophora fasciata =

Species of moth

Craniophora fasciata is a moth of the family Noctuidae first described by Frederic Moore in 1884. It is found in Sri Lanka, Japan, Korea, Taiwan, Thailand and Australia.

The adult has brown or grey wings. A broken dark band runs across its forewings. The caterpillar is greenish with a yellow stripe along each side. There are another two yellow stripes in the last body segment. Larval food plants include Olea, Ligustrum vulgare and Osmanthus species.
