= L. vulgare =

L. vulgare may refer to:

- Leucanthemum vulgare, the oxeye daisy, a widespread flowering plant species
- Ligustrum vulgare, the wild privet, a plant species

== See also ==
- Vulgare
