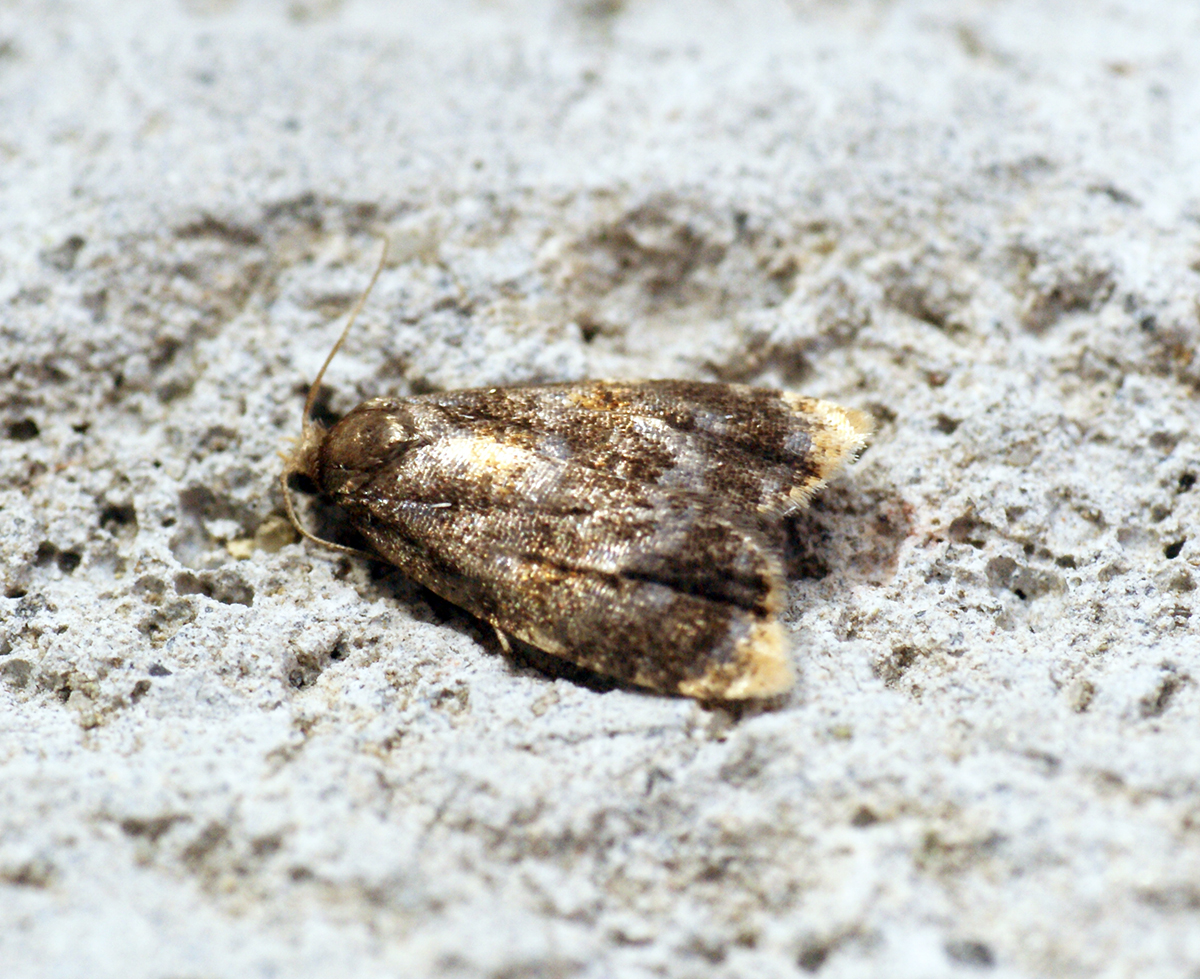

Scientific classification
- Domain: Eukaryota
- Kingdom: Animalia
- Phylum: Arthropoda
- Class: Insecta
- Order: Lepidoptera
- Family: Tortricidae
- Genus: Spatalistis
- Species: S. bifasciana

Binomial name
- Spatalistis bifasciana (Hübner, [1787])

Synonyms
- Phalaena (Tortrix) bifasciana Hübner, [1787]; Argyrotoza apicalis Westwood & Humphreys, 1845; Argyrotoza audouinana Duponchel, in Godart, 1836

= Spatalistis bifasciana =

Species of tortrix moth

Spatalistis bifasciana is a species of moth of the family Tortricidae. It is found in most of Europe.

The wingspan is 12–17 mm. Adults are on wing from May to July.

The larvae have been recorded feeding internally in the berries or fruits of Vaccinium myrtillus, Vaccinium uliginosum, Rhamnus catharcticus, Cornus mas and Ligustrum vulgare. However, recent research recorded the larvae amongst dead Quercus and Castanea sativa leaves.
