= Stegea eripalis =

Scientific classification
- Kingdom: Animalia
- Phylum: Arthropoda
- Class: Insecta
- Order: Lepidoptera
- Family: Crambidae
- Genus: Stegea
- Species: S. eripalis

Binomial name
- Stegea eripalis (Grote, 1878)

Synonyms
- Homophysa eripalis Grote, 1878

Species of moth

Stegea eripalis is a moth in the family Crambidae. It was described by Augustus Radcliffe Grote in 1878. It is found in North America, where it has been recorded from Alabama, Arkansas, Florida, Illinois, Indiana, Maryland, Mississippi, Ohio, Oklahoma, Ontario, South Carolina, Tennessee and Texas.
