= Spatalistis nephritica =

Scientific classification
- Domain: Eukaryota
- Kingdom: Animalia
- Phylum: Arthropoda
- Class: Insecta
- Order: Lepidoptera
- Family: Tortricidae
- Genus: Spatalistis
- Species: S. nephritica

Binomial name
- Spatalistis nephritica Razowski, 1966

Synonyms
- Tymbarcha beryllocentra Diakonoff, 1983

Species of moth

Spatalistis nephritica is a species of moth of the family Tortricidae. It is found on Sulawesi.
