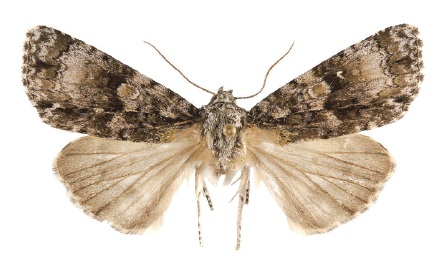

Scientific classification
- Domain: Eukaryota
- Kingdom: Animalia
- Phylum: Arthropoda
- Class: Insecta
- Order: Lepidoptera
- Superfamily: Noctuoidea
- Family: Noctuidae
- Genus: Craniophora
- Species: C. praeclara

Binomial name
- Craniophora praeclara (Graeser, 1890)

Synonyms
- Acronycta praeclara Graeser, 1890

= Craniophora praeclara =

Species of moth

Craniophora praeclara is a moth of the family Noctuidae. Its distribution includes North Korea, Japan (Hokkaido, Honshu, Shikoku and Kyushu), China (Guizhou (including Fanjingshan), Heilongjiang, Jilin), and the Russian Far East (Lower and Middle Amur, Primorye, Sakhalin, South Kuril Islands).

The species is called ニッコウケンモン in Japanese, 큰쥐똥나무저녁나방 (automated translation: wood pellets evening large moth) in Korean, and 锋首夜蛾 (automated translation: Feng first armyworm) in China.

Its wingspan is 38–45 mm. They emerge as adults between June and September in Japan.

Graeser's 1890 description described a complex mix of colorations and markings on the wings, a purplish grey head and thorax mixed with fuscous, and a whiteish abdomen "irrorated with fuscous and dorsally tinged with brown towards base, the crests blackish."
