= Stegea hermalis =

Scientific classification
- Kingdom: Animalia
- Phylum: Arthropoda
- Class: Insecta
- Order: Lepidoptera
- Family: Crambidae
- Genus: Stegea
- Species: S. hermalis

Binomial name
- Stegea hermalis (Schaus, 1920)

Synonyms
- Symphysa hermalis Schaus, 1920

Species of moth

Stegea hermalis is a moth in the family Crambidae. It was described by William Schaus in 1920. It is found from southern Mexico to Panama.
