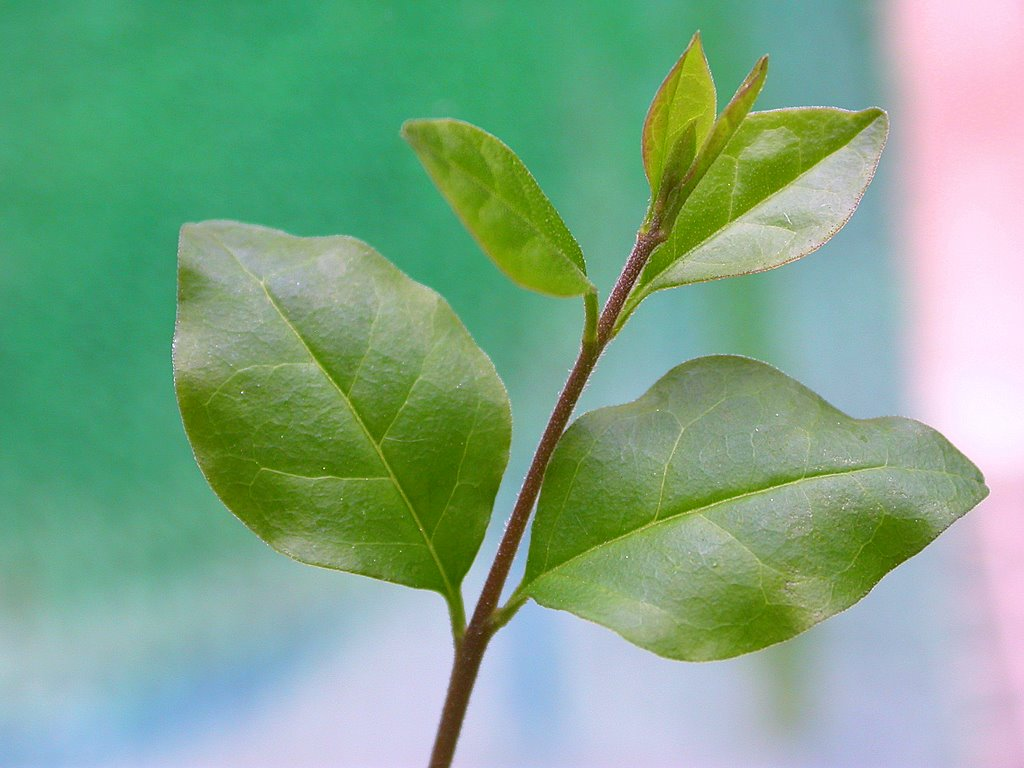

Conservation status
- Least Concern (IUCN 3.1)

Scientific classification
- Kingdom: Plantae
- Clade: Tracheophytes
- Clade: Angiosperms
- Clade: Eudicots
- Clade: Asterids
- Order: Lamiales
- Family: Oleaceae
- Genus: Ligustrum
- Species: L. sinense

Binomial name
- Ligustrum sinense Lour.

= Ligustrum sinense =

Chinese privet

Species of plant

Ligustrum sinense (Chinese privet; syn. L. villosum; in Mandarin: 杻; pinyin: chǒu) is a species of flowering plant in the family Oleaceae. This privet is native to China, Taiwan and Vietnam, and invasive in Réunion, the Andaman Islands, Norfolk Island, Costa Rica, Honduras, Panama and much of the eastern and southern United States (from Texas and Florida north to Kansas, Illinois, New Jersey, Massachusetts and Connecticut). The name "Chinese privet" may also refer to Ligustrum lucidum.

== Description ==
Ligustrum sinense is a deciduous shrub growing to 2–7 m (6.5–23 ft) tall, with densely hairy shoots. The leaves are opposite, 2–7 cm (0.7–2.7 in) long and 1–3 cm (0.3–1.1 in) broad, rarely larger, with an entire margin and a 2–8 mm (0.07–0.31 in) petiole. The flowers are white, with a four-lobed corolla 3.5–5.5 mm (0.1–0.2 in) long. The fruit is subglobose, 5–8 mm (0.1–0.3 in) diameter, and considered poisonous.

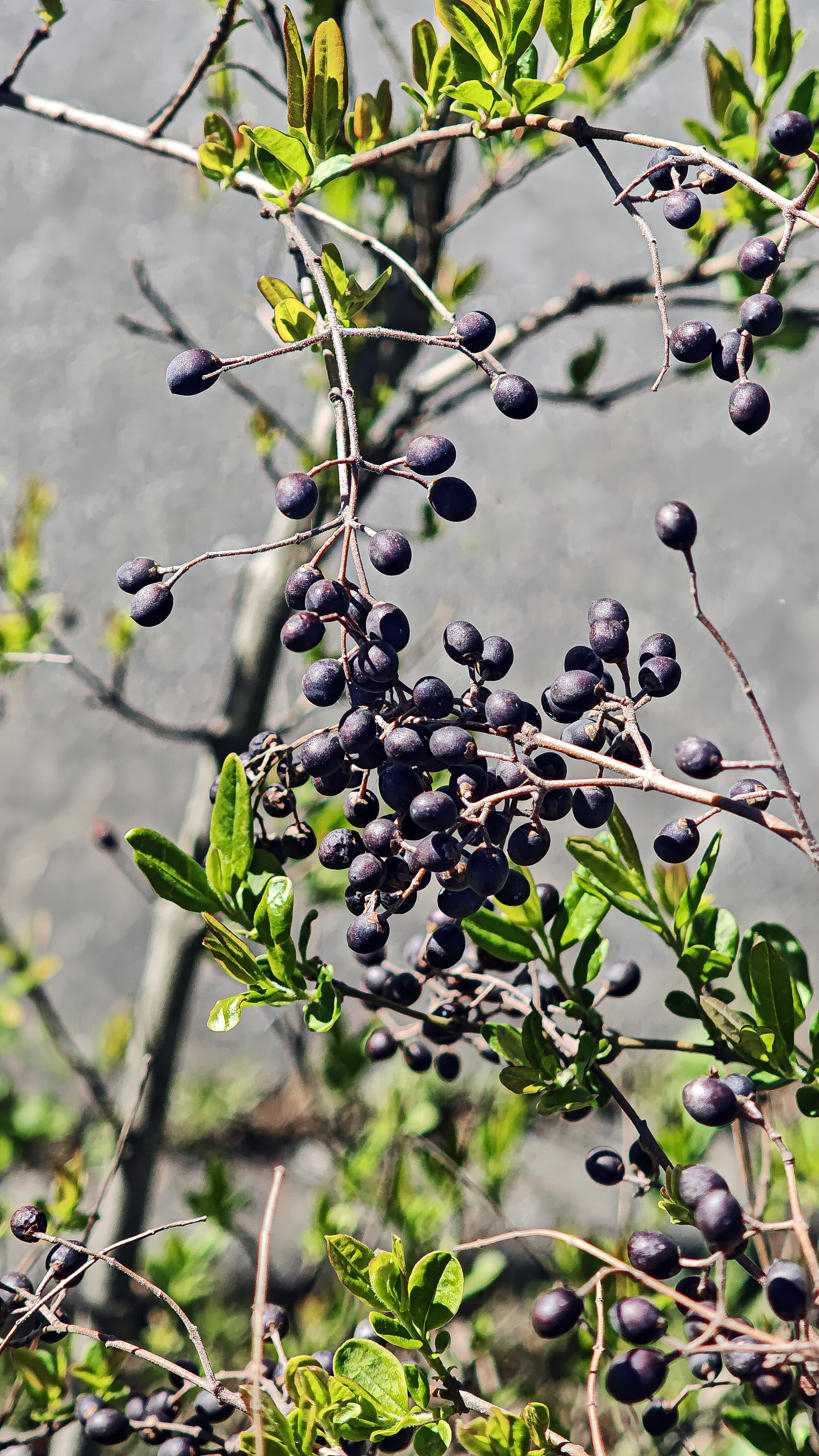
Ligustrum sinense berries

== Varieties ==
The following varieties are accepted by the Flora of China:

- Ligustrum sinense var. sinense
- Ligustrum sinense var. concavum M.C.Chang
- Ligustrum sinense var. coryanum (W.W.Sm.) Hand.-Mazz.
- Ligustrum sinense var. dissimile S.J.Hao
- Ligustrum sinense var. luodianense M.C.Chang
- Ligustrum sinense var. myrianthum (Diels) Hoefker
- Ligustrum sinense var. opienense Y.C.Yang
- Ligustrum sinense var. rugosulum (W.W.Sm.) M.C.Chang

== Cultivation and uses ==
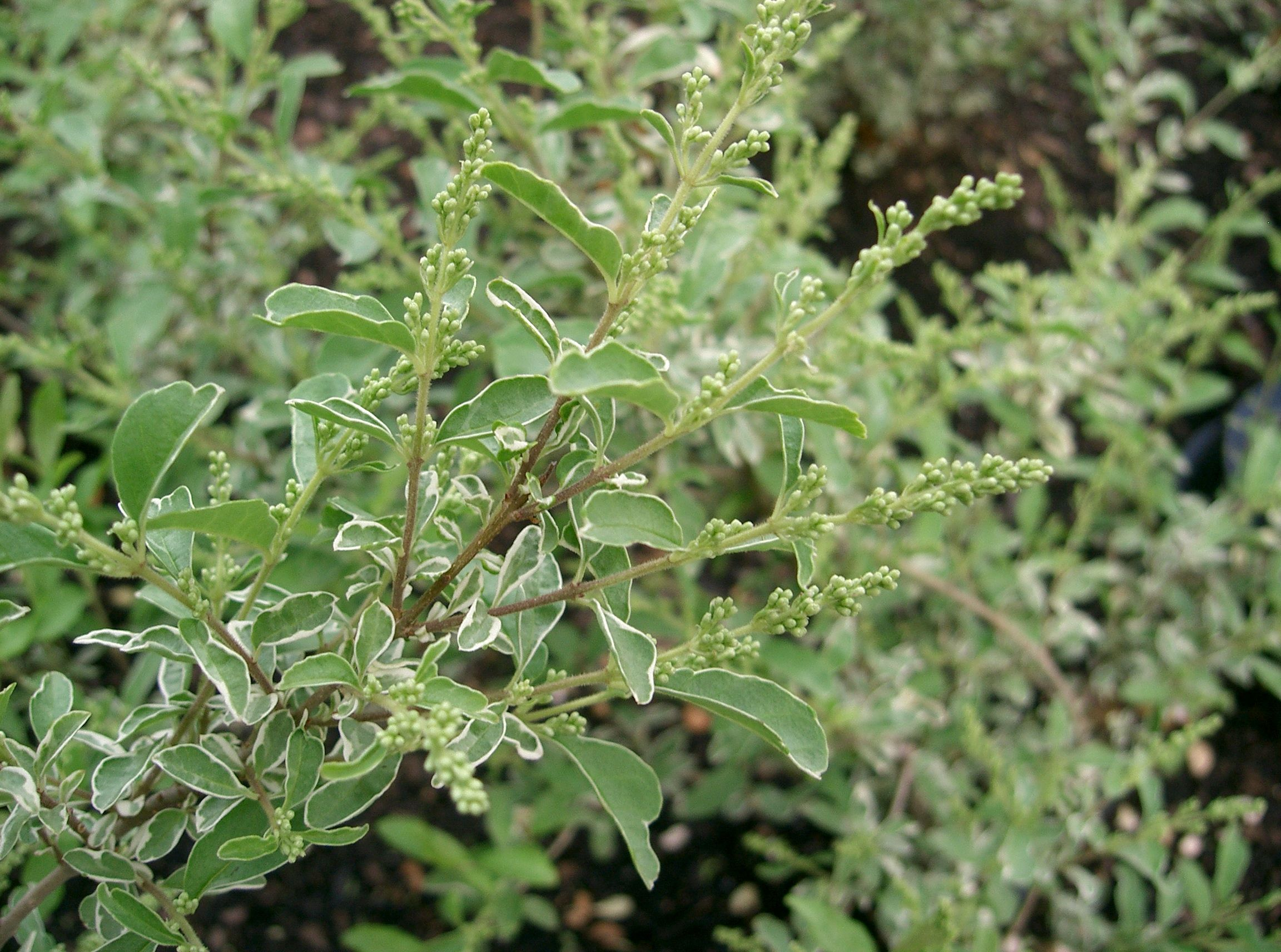
Foliage of the variegated cultivar L. sinense 'Variegatum'

It is cultivated as an ornamental plant and for hedges. Several cultivars have been selected, including the very floriferous 'Multiflorum', the variegated cultivar 'Variegatum', and the dwarf cultivar 'Wimbei' growing to 0.5 m and with leaves only 6 mm long.

It was introduced to North America to be used for hedges and landscaping where it has now escaped from cultivation and is listed as an invasive plant in southeastern states. It is estimated that Chinese privet now occupies over one million hectares of land across 12 states ranging from Virginia to Florida and west to Texas, with detrimental effects to biodiversity and forest health.

== Etymology ==
Ligustrum means 'binder'. It was named by Pliny and Virgil.

== See also ==
- Privet as an invasive plant
