= Spatalistis translineata =

Scientific classification
- Domain: Eukaryota
- Kingdom: Animalia
- Phylum: Arthropoda
- Class: Insecta
- Order: Lepidoptera
- Family: Tortricidae
- Genus: Spatalistis
- Species: S. translineata

Binomial name
- Spatalistis translineata Meyrick, 1921

Species of moth

Spatalistis translineata is a species of moth of the family Tortricidae. It is found on Java.

The wingspan is about 19 mm. The forewings are yellow, finely reticulated with dark ferruginous-brown speckling, and more or less strewn with numerous pale silvery-leaden dots. There is a narrow streak of ochreous-orange suffusion along the anterior half of the costa and a narrow brownish-orange streak from before the middle of the dorsum to the costa near the apex. There are also three or four small blackish dots on or near the margins of this streak and one or two in the disc towards the base. The hindwings are yellow-whitish.
