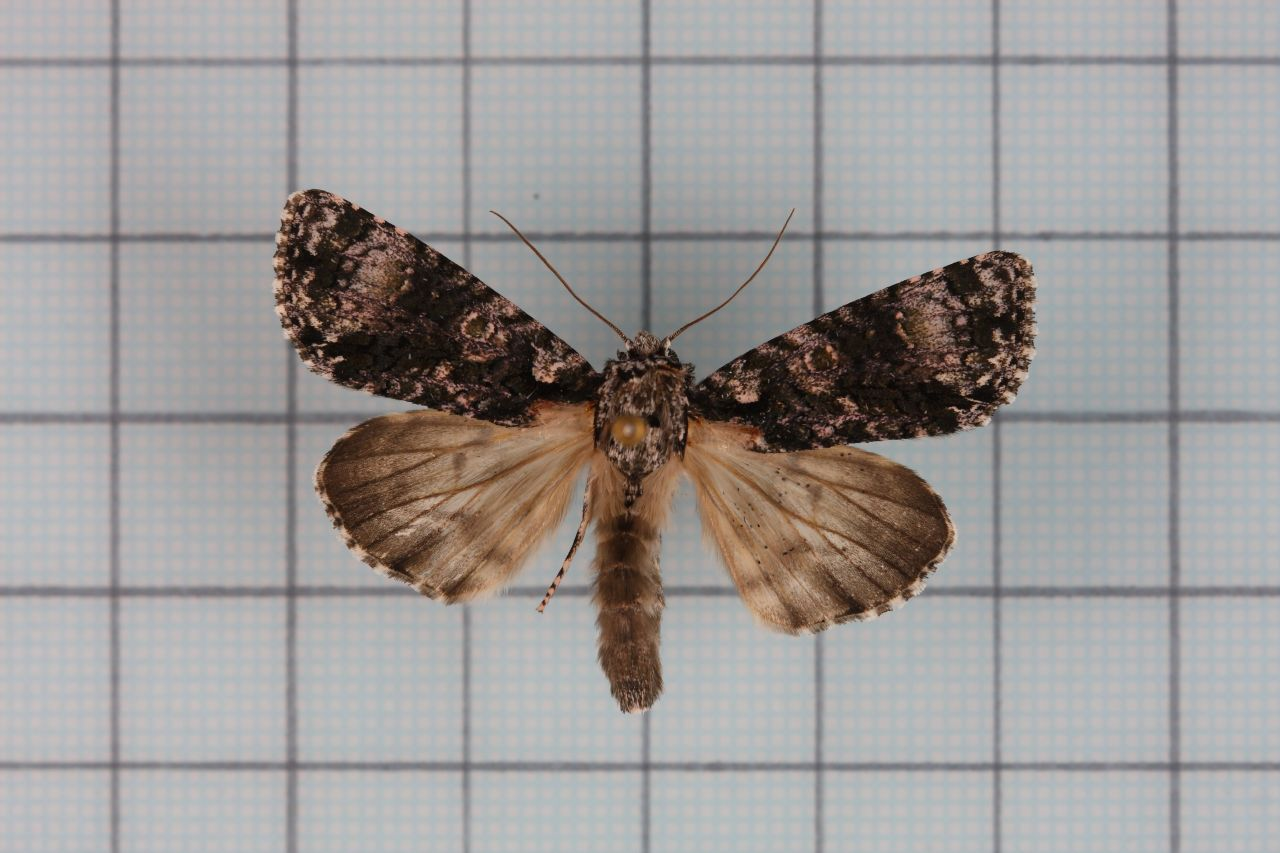

Scientific classification
- Domain: Eukaryota
- Kingdom: Animalia
- Phylum: Arthropoda
- Class: Insecta
- Order: Lepidoptera
- Superfamily: Noctuoidea
- Family: Noctuidae
- Genus: Craniophora
- Species: C. harmandi

Binomial name
- Craniophora harmandi (Poujade, 1898)

Synonyms
- Acronycta harmandi Poujade, 1898; Acronicta nigromaculata Warren, 1912; Craniophora picata Wileman, 1914

= Craniophora harmandi =

Species of moth

Craniophora harmandi is a moth of the family Noctuidae. It is found in Japan, They emerge as adults between June and September in Japan. Nepal, and the western Himalaya to Taiwan "in the region with monsoonic influence."

The wingspan is 35–40 mm. In Japan it emerges as an adult in May and in September to October.

It's the allopatric sister taxon of Craniophora fujianensis.

It is listed in Japan's Ministry of the Environment Red List (環境省レッドリスト) as Class IB Endangered (絶滅危惧IB類) in Japan.
