= Spatalistis phulchokia =

Scientific classification
- Domain: Eukaryota
- Kingdom: Animalia
- Phylum: Arthropoda
- Class: Insecta
- Order: Lepidoptera
- Family: Tortricidae
- Genus: Spatalistis
- Species: S. phulchokia

Binomial name
- Spatalistis phulchokia Razowski, 2012

Species of moth

Spatalistis phulchokia is a species of moth of the family Tortricidae. It is found in Nepal. The habitat consists of Schima-Castanopsis forests.

The wingspan is about 21 mm.

== Etymology ==
The species name refers to the type locality.
