= Spatalistis delta =

Scientific classification
- Domain: Eukaryota
- Kingdom: Animalia
- Phylum: Arthropoda
- Class: Insecta
- Order: Lepidoptera
- Family: Tortricidae
- Genus: Spatalistis
- Species: S. delta

Binomial name
- Spatalistis delta Razowski, 2003

Species of moth

Spatalistis delta is a species of moth of the family Tortricidae. It is found in Vietnam.
