= Craniophora pontica =

Scientific classification
- Domain: Eukaryota
- Kingdom: Animalia
- Phylum: Arthropoda
- Class: Insecta
- Order: Lepidoptera
- Superfamily: Noctuoidea
- Family: Noctuidae
- Genus: Craniophora
- Species: C. pontica

Binomial name
- Craniophora pontica (Staudinger, 1879)

Synonyms
- Acronycta pontica Staudinger, 1879

Species of moth

Craniophora pontica is a moth of the family Noctuidae. It is found from the southern Balkans through the Near East and parts of the Middle East to Afghanistan. In the Levant it has been recorded from Lebanon and Israel.

Adults are on wing from April to May and in September. There are two generations per year.

The larvae feed on Fraxinus species.
