= Stegea mexicana =

Scientific classification
- Kingdom: Animalia
- Phylum: Arthropoda
- Class: Insecta
- Order: Lepidoptera
- Family: Crambidae
- Genus: Stegea
- Species: S. mexicana

Binomial name
- Stegea mexicana Munroe, 1964

Species of moth

Stegea mexicana is a moth in the family Crambidae. It is found in Mexico (Veracruz).
