= Spatalistis zygota =

Scientific classification
- Domain: Eukaryota
- Kingdom: Animalia
- Phylum: Arthropoda
- Class: Insecta
- Order: Lepidoptera
- Family: Tortricidae
- Genus: Spatalistis
- Species: S. zygota

Binomial name
- Spatalistis zygota Razowski, 1964

Species of moth

Spatalistis zygota is a species of moth of the family Tortricidae. It is found in India (Assam).
