= Spatalistis aglaoxantha =

Scientific classification
- Kingdom: Animalia
- Phylum: Arthropoda
- Class: Insecta
- Order: Lepidoptera
- Family: Tortricidae
- Genus: Spatalistis
- Species: S. aglaoxantha

Binomial name
- Spatalistis aglaoxantha Meyrick, 1924

Species of moth

Spatalistis aglaoxantha is a species of moth of the family Tortricidae. It is found in China (Sichuan, Zhejiang).

The wingspan is about 16 mm. The forewings are bright clear yellow with two or three small ferruginous dots towards the dorsum anteriorly and an irregular violet-fuscous costal band becoming reddish-ochreous on the posterior half. There are several small raised blue-leaden-metallic spots, costa throughout reddish-ochreous mixed with yellow and there is a large dark violet-grey terminal blotch occupying two-fifths of the wing on the dorsal half, but narrowed upwards and not reaching the costa, including several small leaden-metallic spots, the apical and terminal edge are reddish-ochreous mixed with yellow. The hindwings are grey, the costal half whitish from the base to beyond the middle.
