= Spatalistis alleni =

Scientific classification
- Domain: Eukaryota
- Kingdom: Animalia
- Phylum: Arthropoda
- Class: Insecta
- Order: Lepidoptera
- Family: Tortricidae
- Genus: Spatalistis
- Species: S. alleni

Binomial name
- Spatalistis alleni Razowski, 2012

Species of moth

Spatalistis alleni is a species of moth of the family Tortricidae. It is found in Thailand.

The wingspan is about 13 mm.

== Etymology ==
The species is named Mr M. G. Allen, a collector of Lepidoptera in south-east Asia.
