= Spatalistis violacea =

Scientific classification
- Domain: Eukaryota
- Kingdom: Animalia
- Phylum: Arthropoda
- Class: Insecta
- Order: Lepidoptera
- Family: Tortricidae
- Genus: Spatalistis
- Species: S. violacea

Binomial name
- Spatalistis violacea Diakonoff, 1953

Species of moth

Spatalistis violacea is a species of moth of the family Tortricidae. It is found in Papua New Guinea.
