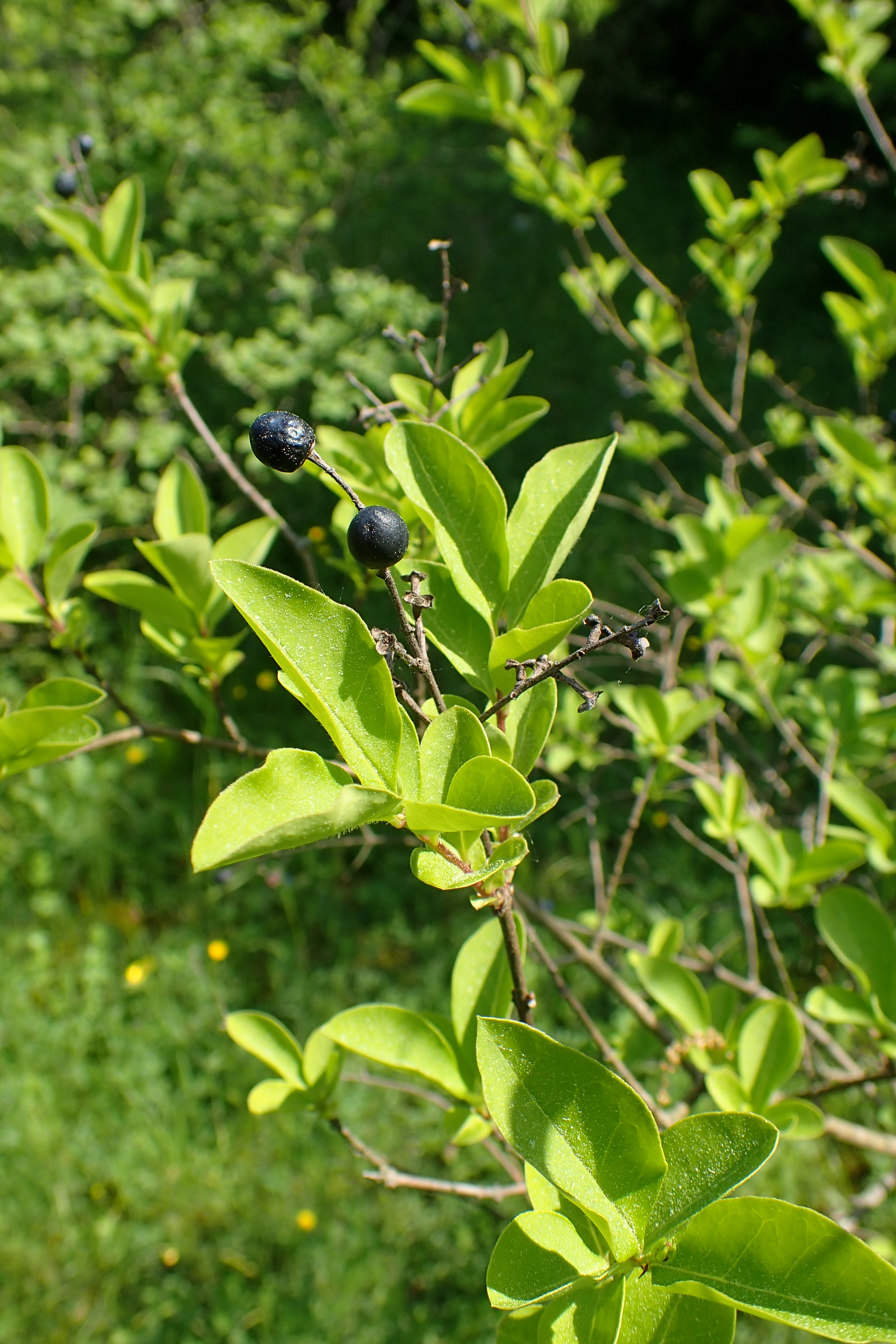
- Ligustrum × ibolium foliage and fruit

Scientific classification
- Kingdom: Plantae
- Clade: Tracheophytes
- Clade: Angiosperms
- Clade: Eudicots
- Clade: Asterids
- Order: Lamiales
- Family: Oleaceae
- Genus: Ligustrum
- Species: L. × ibolium

Binomial name
- Ligustrum × ibolium Coe ex Rehder

= Ligustrum × ibolium =

Nothospecies of flowering plant

Ligustrum × ibolium, called the north privet or ibolium privet, is a hybrid species of flowering plant in the genus Ligustrum, the result of a cross between Ligustrum obtusifolium (border privet) and Ligustrum ovalifolium (Korean privet). It is probably the most common privet used for hedging in the United States. It grows up to 1 m (3 ft) per year.
