= Stegea powelli =

Scientific classification
- Kingdom: Animalia
- Phylum: Arthropoda
- Class: Insecta
- Order: Lepidoptera
- Family: Crambidae
- Genus: Stegea
- Species: S. powelli

Binomial name
- Stegea powelli Munroe, 1972

Species of moth

Stegea powelli is a moth in the family Crambidae. It is found in North America, where it has been recorded from California.
