= Stegea fiachnalis =

Scientific classification
- Kingdom: Animalia
- Phylum: Arthropoda
- Class: Insecta
- Order: Lepidoptera
- Family: Crambidae
- Genus: Stegea
- Species: S. fiachnalis

Binomial name
- Stegea fiachnalis (Schaus, 1924)

Synonyms
- Aulacodes fiachnalis Schaus, 1924; Aulacodes fiachmalis Klima, 1937

Species of moth

Stegea fiachnalis is a moth in the family Crambidae. It is found in Panama.
