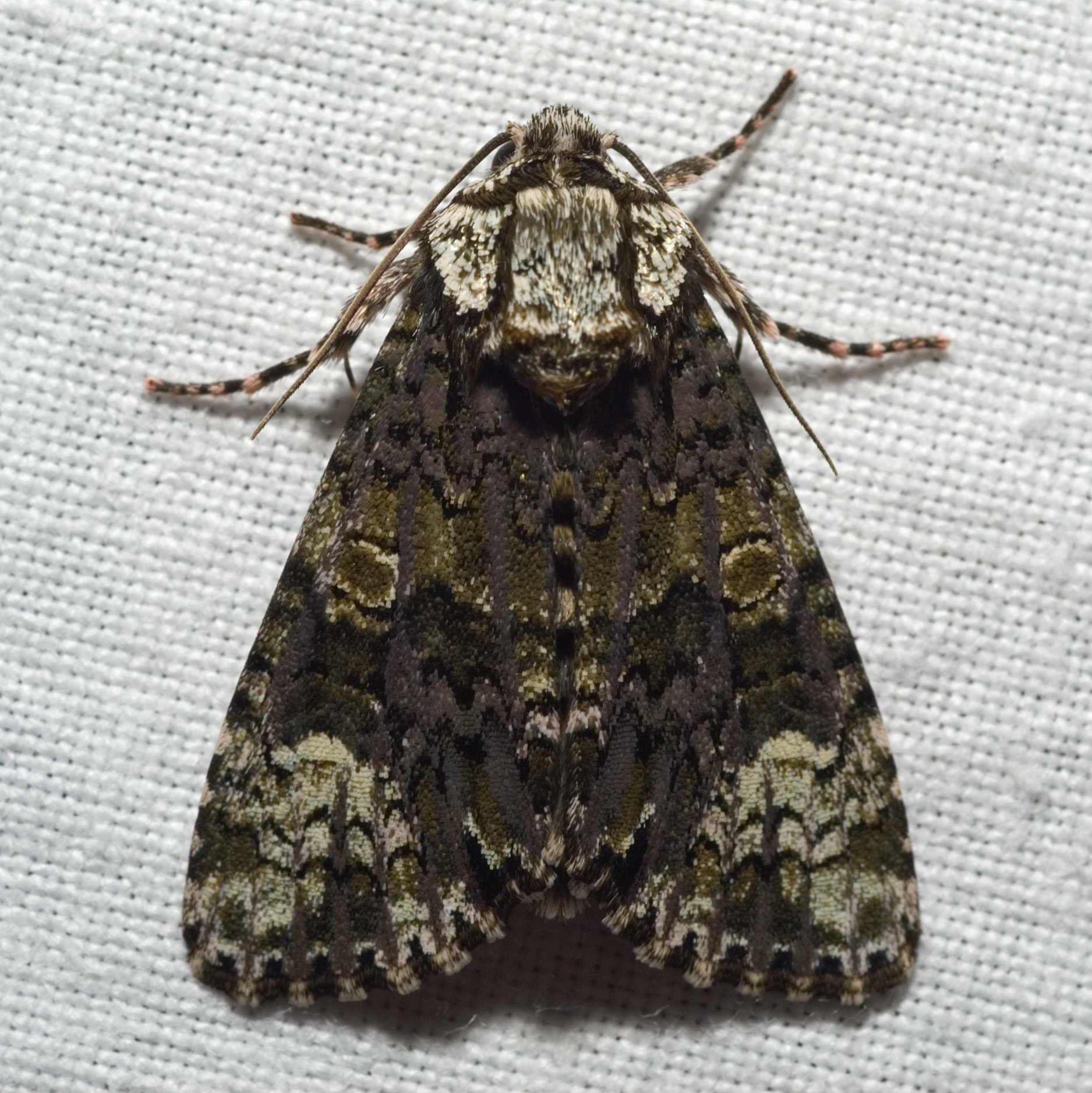
- Craniophora ligustri

Scientific classification
- Kingdom: Animalia
- Phylum: Arthropoda
- Class: Insecta
- Order: Lepidoptera
- Superfamily: Noctuoidea
- Family: Noctuidae
- Subfamily: Acronictinae
- Genus: Craniophora; Snellen, 1867

Synonyms
- Bisulcia Chapman, 1890; Cranionycta Lattin, 1949; Hampsonidia Inoue, 1958; Miracopa Draudt, 1950

= Craniophora =

Genus of moths

Craniophora is a genus of moths of the family Noctuidae.

== Species ==
- Craniophora draudti H.L. Han & Kononenko, 2010
- Craniophora praeclara (Graeser, 1890)
- Craniophora fasciata Moore, [1884]
- Craniophora fujianensis Kiss & Gyulai, 2013
- Craniophora harmandi (Poujade, 1898)
- Craniophora ligustri Denis & Schiffermüller, 1775 – coronet
- Craniophora melanisans Wiltshire, 1980
- Craniophora malesiae Holloway, 1989
- Craniophora nodyna Turner, 1904
- Craniophora oda (Lattin, 1949)
- Craniophora phaeocosma Turner, 1920
- Craniophora pontica Staudinger, 1879
- Craniophora sichuanensis Kiss, Gyulai & Saldaitis, 2013
