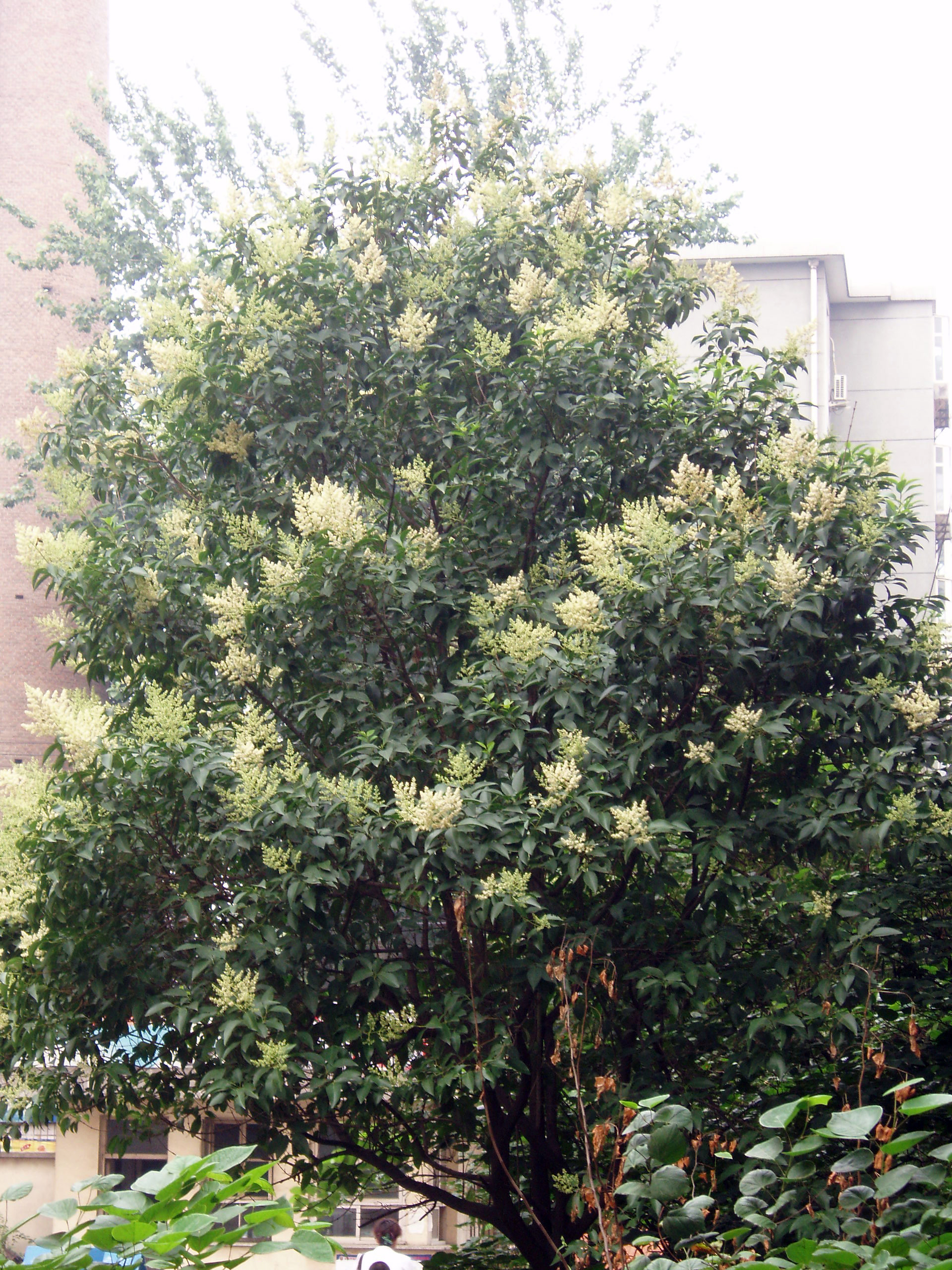

Conservation status
- Least Concern (IUCN 3.1)

Scientific classification
- Kingdom: Plantae
- Clade: Tracheophytes
- Clade: Angiosperms
- Clade: Eudicots
- Clade: Asterids
- Order: Lamiales
- Family: Oleaceae
- Genus: Ligustrum
- Species: L. lucidum

Binomial name
- Ligustrum lucidum W.T.Aiton

= Ligustrum lucidum =

Species of tree

Ligustrum lucidum, the broad-leaf privet, Chinese privet, glossy privet, tree privet or wax-leaf privet, is a species of flowering plant in the olive family Oleaceae, native to the southern half of China and naturalized in many places. The name "Chinese privet" is also used for Ligustrum sinense.

The Latin specific epithet lucidum means "bright" or "shiny", referring to the leaves.

== Description ==
Ligustrum lucidum is an evergreen tree growing to 10 m (33 ft) tall and broad. The leaves are opposite, glossy dark green, 6–17 centimetres (2.4–6.7 in) long and 3–8 centimetres (1.2–3.1 in) broad. The flowers are similar to other privets, white or near white, borne in panicles, and have a strong fragrance, which some people find unpleasant.

== Distribution ==
Native to southern China, it has been naturalized in Spain, Italy, Algeria, Canary Islands, New Zealand, Lesotho, South Africa, Japan, Korea, Australia, Norfolk Island, Chiapas, Central America, Argentina, Uruguay, Southern and Southeastern Brazil and the southern United States (California, Arizona, Maryland, and the southeast from Texas to North Carolina)

== Uses ==
Ligustrum lucidum is often used as an ornamental tree, sometimes in variegated forms. It is also one of several species of privet used as dense, evergreen hedges, which can be trained to a specific size and shape by regular pruning.

Ligustrum lucidum and the variegated cultivar 'Excelsum Superbum' have gained the Royal Horticultural Society's Award of Garden Merit.

It has become an invasive species in some areas where it has been introduced, such as urban areas in the southeastern United States. It is classed as a noxious weed in New South Wales, Australia, and is similarly listed in New Zealand's National Pest Plant Accord.

It is the origin of Chinese insect wax from the Ericerus pela used for making candles.

=== Ethnomedical uses ===
The seeds are known as nu zhen zi (female chastity seed/berry) in traditional Chinese medicine and are believed to nourish liver and kidney yin and jing in the treatment of tinnitus (ringing in the ears), vertigo (dizziness), premature graying of the hair, and soreness/weakness of the lower back and knees. Due to the belief in the berries' ability to nourish the liver, they are also used in the treatment of disorders of the eye involving red or dry eyes, blurred vision, and pain.

== Etymology ==
Ligustrum means "binder".

The Latin specific epithet lucidum means "bright" or "shiny", referring to the leaves.

== Gallery ==
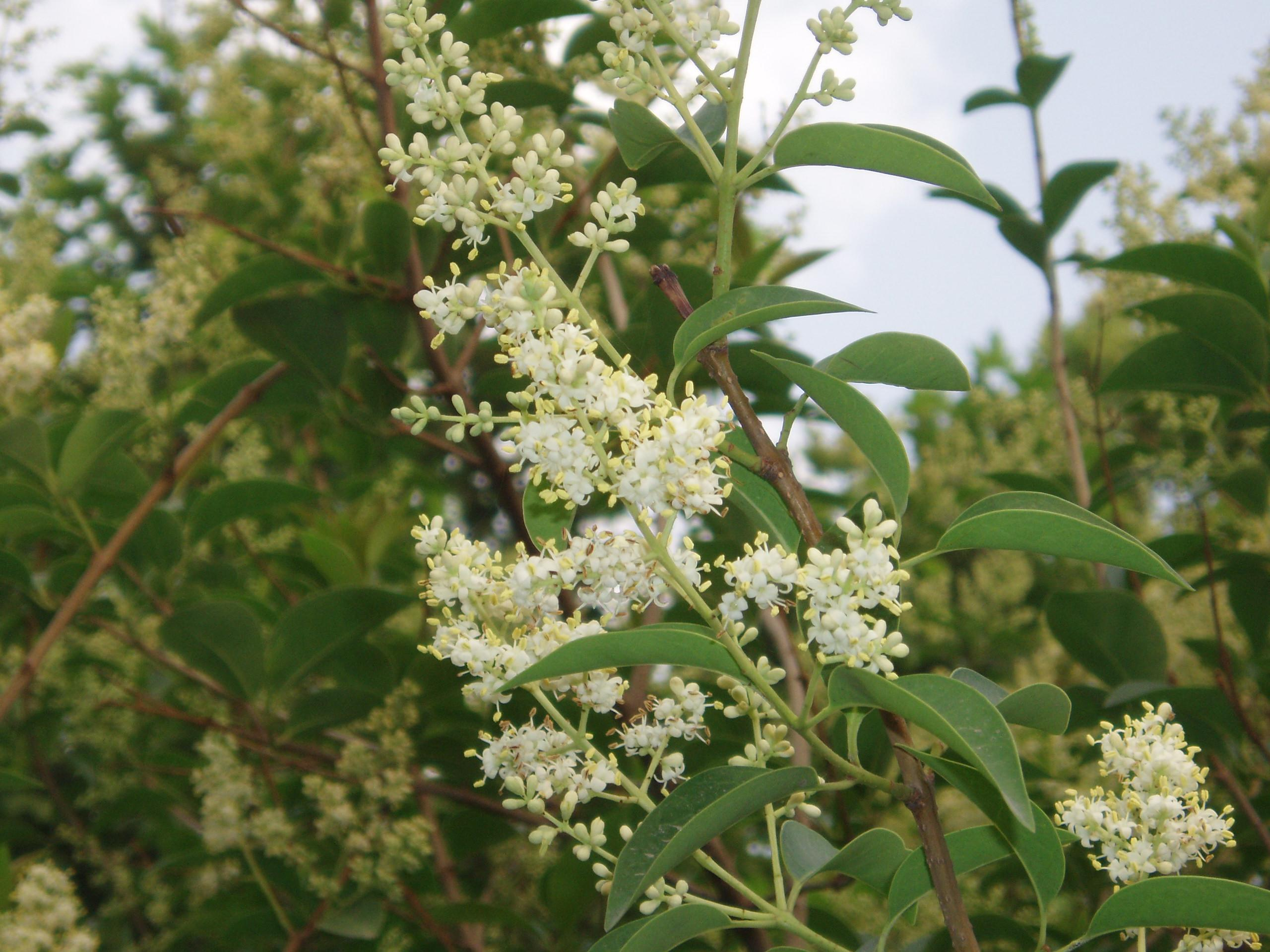
Ligustrum lucidum flowers

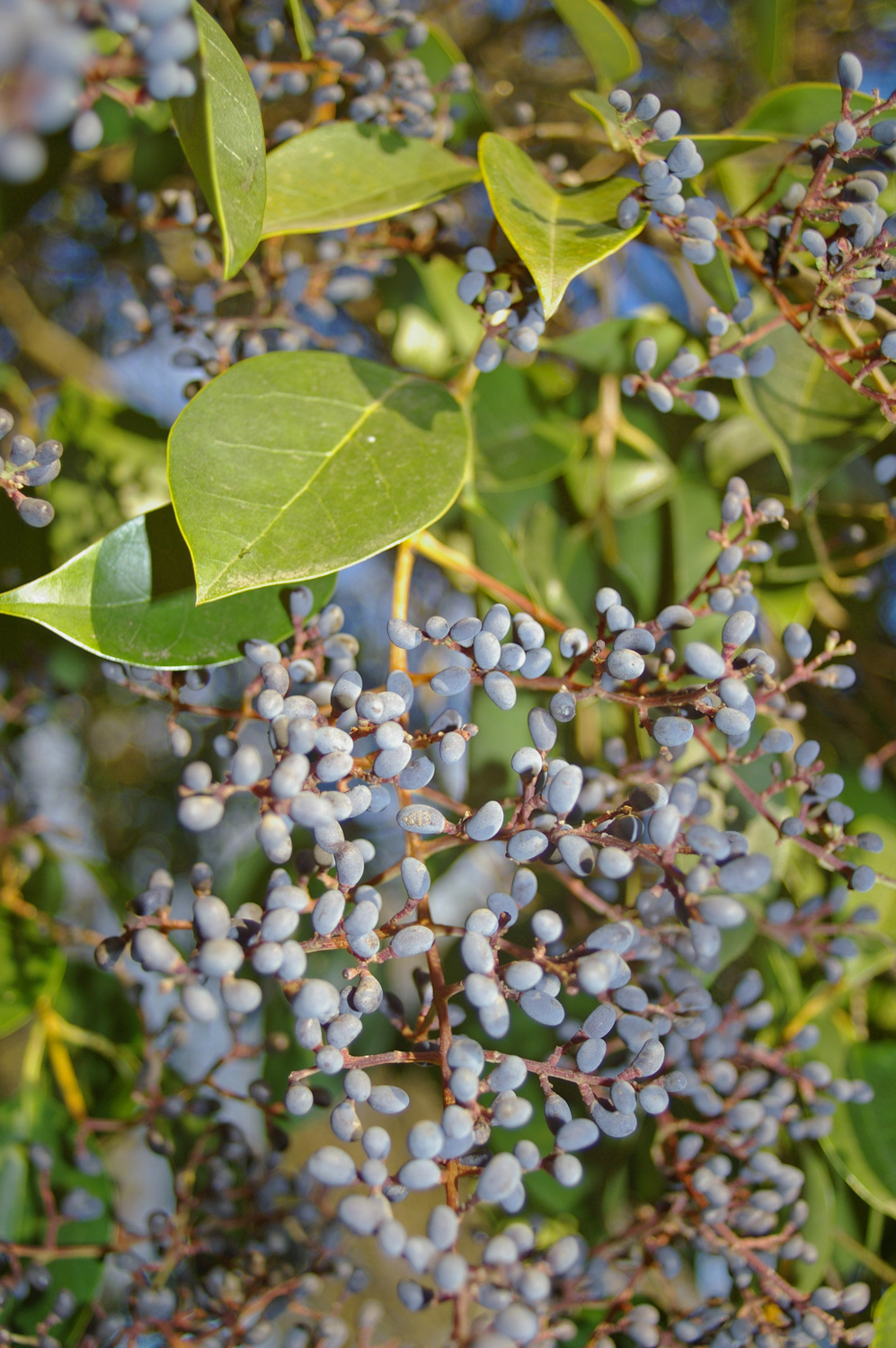
Ligustrum lucidum berries

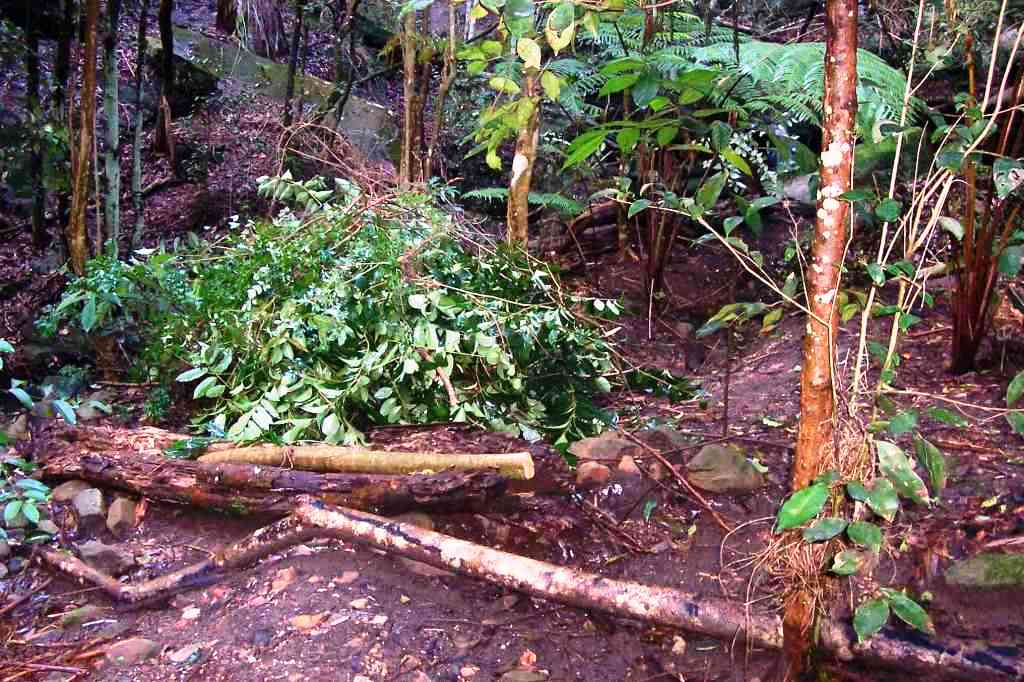
Ligustrum lucidum killed as weeds in an Australian rainforest

== See also ==
- Privet as an invasive plant
