= Spatalistis katmandana =

Scientific classification
- Kingdom: Animalia
- Phylum: Arthropoda
- Class: Insecta
- Order: Lepidoptera
- Family: Tortricidae
- Genus: Spatalistis
- Species: S. katmandana

Binomial name
- Spatalistis katmandana Razowski, 2012

Species of moth

Spatalistis katmandana is a species of moth of the family Tortricidae. It is found in Nepal. The habitat consists of mixed primary forests.

== Etymology ==
The species name refers to Kathmandu District, the type locality.
