= Spatalistis tyrophthora =

Scientific classification
- Kingdom: Animalia
- Phylum: Arthropoda
- Class: Insecta
- Order: Lepidoptera
- Family: Tortricidae
- Genus: Spatalistis
- Species: S. tyrophthora

Binomial name
- Spatalistis tyrophthora Meyrick, 1912

Species of moth

Spatalistis tyrophthora is a species of moth of the family Tortricidae. It is found in India (Assam).

The wingspan is 12–13 mm. Adults have been recorded on wing in November.
