= Spatalistis numismata =

Scientific classification
- Kingdom: Animalia
- Phylum: Arthropoda
- Class: Insecta
- Order: Lepidoptera
- Family: Tortricidae
- Genus: Spatalistis
- Species: S. numismata

Binomial name
- Spatalistis numismata Diakonoff, 1968

Species of moth

Spatalistis numismata is a species of moth of the family Tortricidae. It is found in the Philippines (Mindanao).

The wingspan is about 15 mm. The base of the wing, the costa, apex and termen are bright yellow, the costa transversely strigulated with orange. The remainder of the wing occupied by a large suboval blotch, which is light fulvous lilac between the veins which are strongly raised and brightly ferruginous. There are various round deep grey-leaden metallic spots scattered over the blotch. The hindwings are thinly scaled and pale lilac grey. The extreme apex is whitish yellow.
