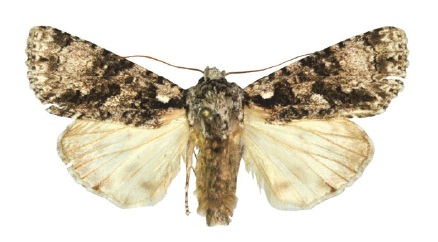
- Craniophora fujianensis fujianensis
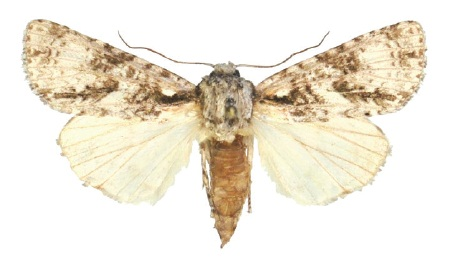
- Craniophora fujianensis hainanensis

Scientific classification
- Domain: Eukaryota
- Kingdom: Animalia
- Phylum: Arthropoda
- Class: Insecta
- Order: Lepidoptera
- Superfamily: Noctuoidea
- Family: Noctuidae
- Genus: Craniophora
- Species: C. fujianensis

Binomial name
- Craniophora fujianensis Kiss & Gyulai, 2013

= Craniophora fujianensis =

Species of moth

Craniophora fujianensis is a moth of the family Noctuidae, named for the Fujian province where it was discovered in 2004. The species is found in Fujian and Hainan Provinces in China, but the nominate subspecies is found only in Fujian, and subspecies C. f. hainanensis is restricted to Hainan.

The male wingspan is 35–38 mm, with no female specimens studied. The holotype was collected from "China, Fujian, Dai Mao Shan, 20 km NW of Longyan, 25°32'N, 116°51'E, 1300 m, 21–30.Nov.2004".

Craniophora fujiansis is the allopatric sister taxon of Craniophora harmandi.

== Subspecies ==
- Craniophora fujianensis fujianensis (Fujian)
- Craniophora fujianensis hainanensis Kiss & Gyulai, 2013 (Hainan)

== Etymology ==
The species name refers to Fujian Province, China, where the species was discovered.
