= Spatalistis rhopica =

Scientific classification
- Kingdom: Animalia
- Phylum: Arthropoda
- Class: Insecta
- Order: Lepidoptera
- Family: Tortricidae
- Genus: Spatalistis
- Species: S. rhopica

Binomial name
- Spatalistis rhopica Meyrick, 1907

Species of moth

Spatalistis rhopica is a species of moth of the family Tortricidae. It is found in India (Assam).

The wingspan is 14–16 mm. The forewings are pale yellowish, finely strigulated with light ochreous and with about seven oblique transverse series of silvery-metallic dots. There are small discal tufts above the middle at one-fourth and halfway, sometimes tipped with dark ferruginous-fuscous. There often is a large deep ferruginous semi-ovate blotch extending along the dorsum from one-fourth to beyond the tornus, posteriorly reaching more than half across the wing and with an oblique projection inwards, but this blotch is sometimes wholly absent. The hindwings are whitish-fuscous or grey, posteriorly more or less suffused with brown or dark fuscous.
