= Spatalistis =

Scientific classification
- Kingdom: Animalia
- Phylum: Arthropoda
- Class: Insecta
- Order: Lepidoptera
- Family: Tortricidae
- Tribe: Tortricini
- Genus: Spatalistis; Meyrick, 1907

Type species
- Spatalistis rhopica Meyrick, 1907

Genus of tortrix moths

Spatalistis is a genus of moths belonging to the subfamily Tortricinae of the family Tortricidae.

The original description of this genus by Edward Meyrick is: The antennae in the male are simple. Palpi moderately long, porrected, second joint rough-scaled above and beneath. Forewings with tufts of scales on surface, in the male sometimes with expansible brush of hairs from towards costa anteriorly, but without membranous fold; 3 and 4 stalked, 7 to termen. Hindwings with 3 and 4 stalked, 5 approximated, 6 and 7 closely approximated towards base.

== Species ==
- Spatalistis aglaoxantha Meyrick, 1924
- Spatalistis alleni Razowski, 2012
- Spatalistis armata Razowski, 1966
- Spatalistis bifasciana (Hubner, [1787])
- Spatalistis christophana (Walsingham, 1900)
- Spatalistis crocomis (Meyrick, 1908)
- Spatalistis delta Razowski, 2003
- Spatalistis droserantha (Meyrick, 1930)
- Spatalistis dulcedana Kuznetzov, 1992
- Spatalistis egesta Razowski, 1974
- Spatalistis gerdia Diakonoff, 1976
- Spatalistis gratiosa Razowski, 1964
- Spatalistis hormota Meyrick, 1907
- Spatalistis katmandana Razowski, 2012
- Spatalistis nephritica Razowski, 1966
- Spatalistis numismata Diakonoff, 1968
- Spatalistis orbigera Meyrick, 1912
- Spatalistis philauta Diakonoff, 1983
- Spatalistis phulchokia Razowski, 2012
- Spatalistis rhopica Meyrick, 1907
- Spatalistis translineata Meyrick, 1921
- Spatalistis tyrophthora Meyrick, 1912
- Spatalistis violacea Diakonoff, 1953
- Spatalistis viridphantasma Razowski, 2012
- Spatalistis zygota Razowski, 1964

== See also ==
- List of Tortricidae genera
