= Stegea simplicialis =

Scientific classification
- Kingdom: Animalia
- Phylum: Arthropoda
- Class: Insecta
- Order: Lepidoptera
- Family: Crambidae
- Genus: Stegea
- Species: S. simplicialis

Binomial name
- Stegea simplicialis (Kearfott, 1907)

Synonyms
- Symphysa simplicialis Kearfott, 1907

Species of moth

Stegea simplicialis is a moth in the family Crambidae. It is found in North America, where it has been recorded from Arizona and Texas.

The length of the forewings is 6–9 mm. Adults are on wing from July to August.
