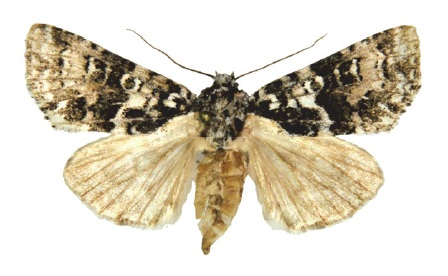

Scientific classification
- Kingdom: Animalia
- Phylum: Arthropoda
- Clade: Pancrustacea
- Class: Insecta
- Order: Lepidoptera
- Superfamily: Noctuoidea
- Family: Noctuidae
- Genus: Craniophora
- Species: C. sichuanensis

Binomial name
- Craniophora sichuanensis Kiss, Gyulai & Saldaitis, 2013

= Craniophora sichuanensis =

Species of moth

Craniophora sichuanensis is a moth of the family Noctuidae. It is found in China (Sichuan). The habitat consists of virgin mixed forests.

The wingspan is 32 mm.

== Etymology ==
The species name refers to Sichuan Province, China, where the species was discovered.
