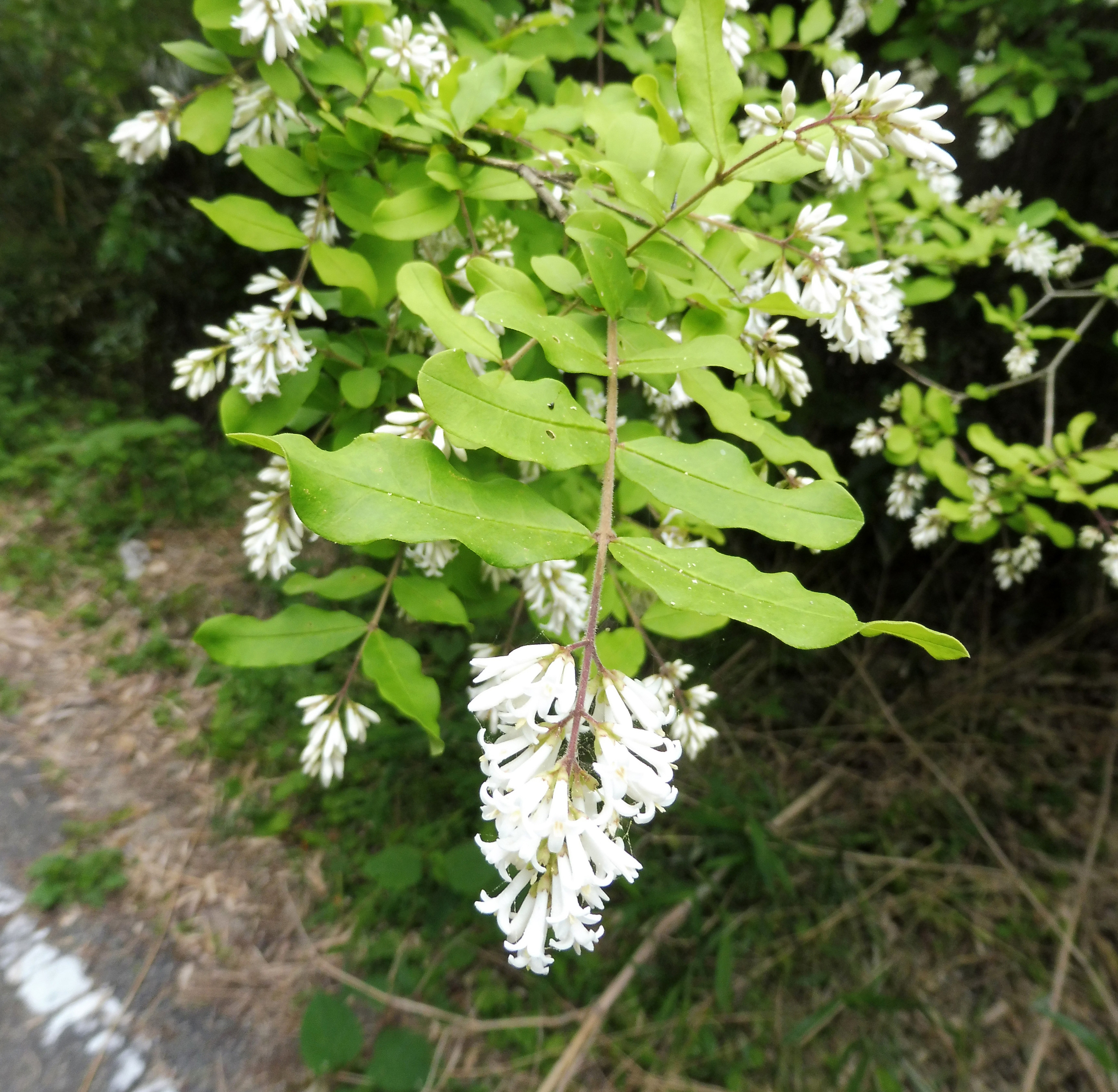

Scientific classification
- Kingdom: Plantae
- Clade: Tracheophytes
- Clade: Angiosperms
- Clade: Eudicots
- Clade: Asterids
- Order: Lamiales
- Family: Oleaceae
- Genus: Ligustrum
- Species: L. obtusifolium

Binomial name
- Ligustrum obtusifolium Siebold & Zucc.

Synonyms
- Ligustrum amurense Carrière

= Ligustrum obtusifolium =

Species of flowering plant

Ligustrum obtusifolium (border privet or Amur privet) is a species of privet, native to Japan, Korea and northeastern China (Heilongjiang, Jiangsu, Liaoning, Shandong, Zhejiang). The species is considered invasive in parts of the United States. It has become very common in southern New England, the mid-Atlantic States, and the Great Lakes regions, with scattered occurrences in the South, the Great Plains, and Washington state. With Ligustrum ovalifolium it is a parent of the widespread hybrid Ligustrum × ibolium.

Ligustrum obtusifolium is a deciduous shrub growing to 3 metres (9.8 ft) tall. The leaves are 1 to 6 centimetres (0.39 to 2.36 in) long and 4 to 25 millimetres (0.16 to 0.98 in) broad.

There are three subspecies:

- Ligustrum obtusifolium subsp. obtusifolium. Japan.
- Ligustrum obtusifolium subsp. microphyllum (Nakai) P.S.Green. Eastern China, Korea, Japan.
- Ligustrum obtusifolium subsp. suave (Kitagawa) Kitagawa. Northeastern China.

== Etymology ==
Ligustrum means ‘binder’. It was named by Pliny and Virgil.
