= Spatalistis droserantha =

Scientific classification
- Kingdom: Animalia
- Phylum: Arthropoda
- Class: Insecta
- Order: Lepidoptera
- Family: Tortricidae
- Genus: Spatalistis
- Species: S. droserantha

Binomial name
- Spatalistis droserantha Meyrick, 1930

Species of moth

Spatalistis droserantha is a species of moth of the family Tortricidae. It is found in India (Assam).

The wingspan is about 15 mm.
