= Stegea jamaicensis =

Scientific classification
- Kingdom: Animalia
- Phylum: Arthropoda
- Class: Insecta
- Order: Lepidoptera
- Family: Crambidae
- Genus: Stegea
- Species: S. jamaicensis

Binomial name
- Stegea jamaicensis Munroe, 1964

Species of moth

Stegea jamaicensis is a moth in the family Crambidae. It is found in Jamaica.
