= Craniophora melanisans =

Scientific classification
- Kingdom: Animalia
- Phylum: Arthropoda
- Class: Insecta
- Order: Lepidoptera
- Superfamily: Noctuoidea
- Family: Noctuidae
- Genus: Craniophora
- Species: C. melanisans

Binomial name
- Craniophora melanisans Wiltshire, 1980

Species of moth

Craniophora melanisans is a moth of the family Noctuidae. It is endemic to the oases of Saudi Arabia, Oman and Israel.

Adult specimens have been recorded in August in Israel, in May in Saudi Arabia and in October in Oman. There are probably multiple generations per year.
