= Stegea clarkei =

Scientific classification
- Kingdom: Animalia
- Phylum: Arthropoda
- Class: Insecta
- Order: Lepidoptera
- Family: Crambidae
- Genus: Stegea
- Species: S. clarkei

Binomial name
- Stegea clarkei Munroe, 1964

Species of moth

Stegea clarkei is a moth in the family Crambidae. It is found in Colombia.
