= Stegea sola =

Scientific classification
- Kingdom: Animalia
- Phylum: Arthropoda
- Class: Insecta
- Order: Lepidoptera
- Family: Crambidae
- Genus: Stegea
- Species: S. sola

Binomial name
- Stegea sola Munroe, 1972

Species of moth

Stegea sola is a moth in the family Crambidae. It is found in North America, where it has been recorded from southern Texas.
