= Spatalistis crocomis =

Scientific classification
- Domain: Eukaryota
- Kingdom: Animalia
- Phylum: Arthropoda
- Class: Insecta
- Order: Lepidoptera
- Family: Tortricidae
- Genus: Spatalistis
- Species: S. crocomis

Binomial name
- Spatalistis crocomis (Meyrick, 1908)

Synonyms
- Tortrix crocomis Meyrick, 1908

Species of moth

Spatalistis crocomis is a species of moth of the family Tortricidae. It is found in India.

The wingspan is about 16 mm. The forewings are rather dark fuscous with an elongate-trapezoidal yellow patch extending along the costa, broadest posteriorly, the costal edge dark fuscous at the base. There is a subtriangular yellow spot on the dorsum, reaching half across the wing. The hindwings are grey.
