= Spatalistis hormota =

Scientific classification
- Domain: Eukaryota
- Kingdom: Animalia
- Phylum: Arthropoda
- Class: Insecta
- Order: Lepidoptera
- Family: Tortricidae
- Genus: Spatalistis
- Species: S. hormota

Binomial name
- Spatalistis hormota Meyrick, 1907

Species of moth

Spatalistis hormota is a species of moth of the family Tortricidae. It is found in India (Assam).

The wingspan is 15–17 mm. The forewings are light ochreous-yellowish, finely strigulated with deeper ochreous and with a slender slightly incurved deep yellow-ochreous streak, sometimes sprinkled with a few dark fuscous points, from the apex of the wing to two-thirds of the dorsum, continued along the dorsum to near the base. The hindwings are whitish-ochreous, posteriorly broadly suffused with fuscous-ochreous and with the apex more fuscous.
