= Stegea salutalis =

Scientific classification
- Kingdom: Animalia
- Phylum: Arthropoda
- Class: Insecta
- Order: Lepidoptera
- Family: Crambidae
- Genus: Stegea
- Species: S. salutalis

Binomial name
- Stegea salutalis (Hulst, 1886)

Synonyms
- Botis salutalis Hulst, 1886; Symphysa ochralis Haimbach, 1908

Species of moth

Stegea salutalis is a moth in the family Crambidae. It is found in North America, where it has been recorded from Arizona, British Columbia, California, Colorado, Montana, New Mexico, Oregon, Texas and Utah. In the south, the range extends to north-western Mexico.

The wingspan is about 18 mm. Adults exhibit considerable geographic and seasonal variation. They are on wing from April to September in two generations per year.

== Subspecies ==
- Stegea salutalis salutalis (Oregon)
- Stegea salutalis grisealis Munroe, 1972 (Texas)
- Stegea salutalis ochralis (Haimbach, 1908) (Colorado)
- Stegea salutalis riparialis Munroe, 1972 (California)
