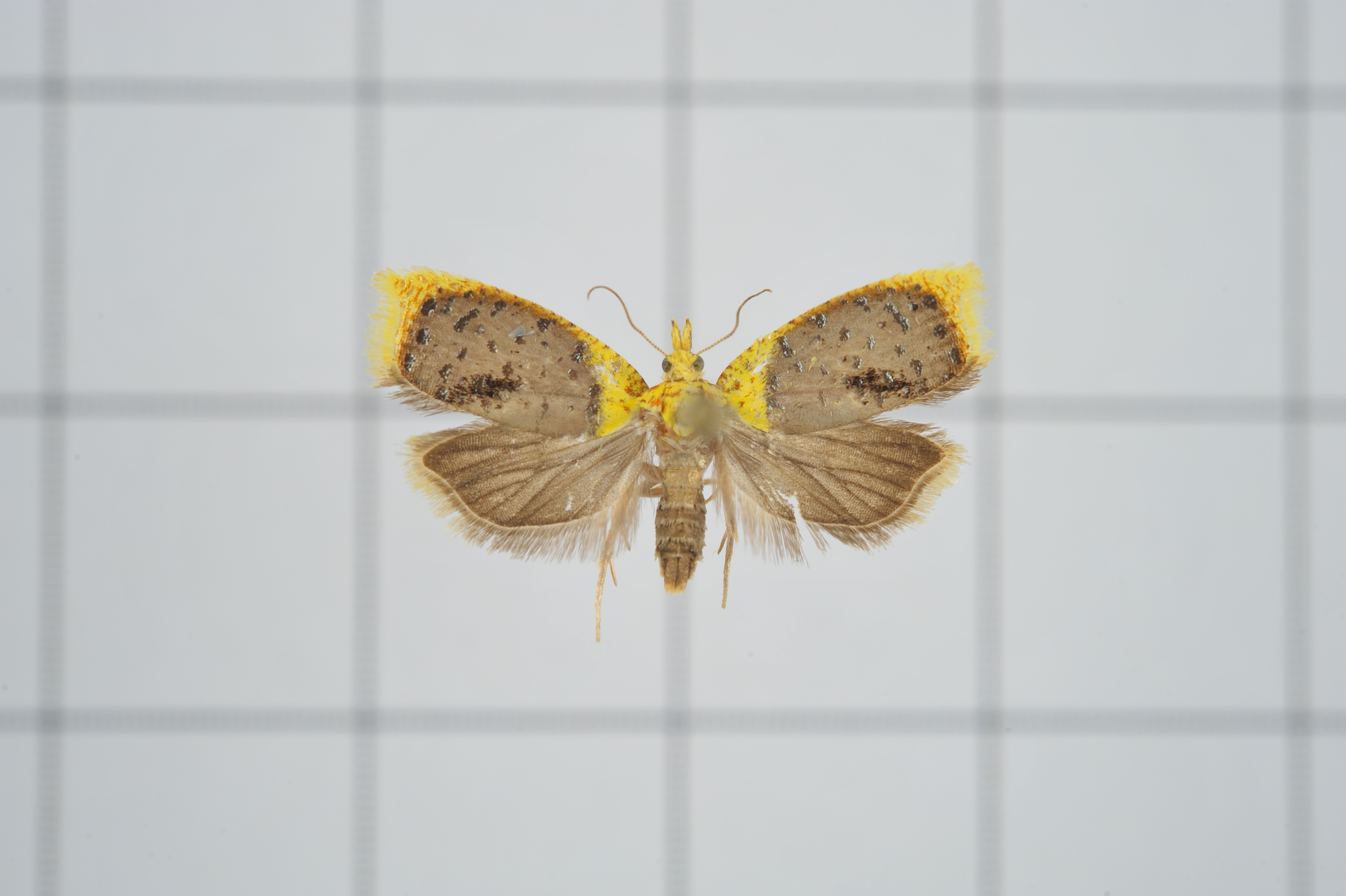

Scientific classification
- Domain: Eukaryota
- Kingdom: Animalia
- Phylum: Arthropoda
- Class: Insecta
- Order: Lepidoptera
- Family: Tortricidae
- Genus: Spatalistis
- Species: S. christophana

Binomial name
- Spatalistis christophana (Walsingham, 1900)

Synonyms
- Tortrix christophana Walsingham, 1900; Tortrix exuberans Walsingham, 1900; Tortrix joannisi Walsingham, 1900

= Spatalistis christophana =

Species of moth

Spatalistis christophana is a species of moth of the family Tortricidae. It is found in Taiwan, China (Zhejiang, Manchuria), Korea, the Russian Far East and Japan.

The wingspan is about 17 mm (0.67 in). The forewings are bright yellow at the base and narrowly along the costa and termen, the remainder of the wing rich red-brown, chestnut-brown or pale chocolate-brown in different varieties. The darker colour has the appearance of a large quadrate patch overflowing the wing from the dorsum, the whole of which it occupies from near the base to the tornus, its anterior margin tending obliquely outwards towards the costa and its upper and outer margins running parallel with the outline of the wing. There are also one or two small streaks connecting it above with the costa. Throughout this patch are a great number of shining metallic steel-grey spots, having a rosy tinge in some varieties. There are one or two spots visible on the pale basal portion of the wing and also along the termen. Scattered between and among those on the dark patch are several tufts of raised scales of the same colour as the patch itself, of which one conspicuous series is arranged in an irregular oblique fascia tending outwards from the costa to the dorsum. The hindwings vary in colour according to the tint of the darker portion of the forewings, which they closely resemble, and shading to pale cinereous at the base.

The larvae feed on Quercus acuta, Quercus mongolica and Quercus dentata.
