= Spatalistis philauta =

Scientific classification
- Domain: Eukaryota
- Kingdom: Animalia
- Phylum: Arthropoda
- Class: Insecta
- Order: Lepidoptera
- Family: Tortricidae
- Genus: Spatalistis
- Species: S. philauta

Binomial name
- Spatalistis philauta Diakonoff, 1983

Species of moth

Spatalistis philauta is a species of moth of the family Tortricidae. It is found on Java.
