= Spatalistis viridphantasma =

Scientific classification
- Domain: Eukaryota
- Kingdom: Animalia
- Phylum: Arthropoda
- Class: Insecta
- Order: Lepidoptera
- Family: Tortricidae
- Genus: Spatalistis
- Species: S. viridphantasma

Binomial name
- Spatalistis viridphantasma Razowski, 2012

Species of moth

Spatalistis viridphantasma is a species of moth of the family Tortricidae. It is found in northern Thailand.

The wingspan is 13–15 mm.

== Etymology ==
The species name refers to the coloration of the species and is derived from Latin viridis (meaning green) and Greek phantasma (meaning phenomenon).
