= Stegea =

Scientific classification
- Kingdom: Animalia
- Phylum: Arthropoda
- Class: Insecta
- Order: Lepidoptera
- Family: Crambidae
- Subfamily: Glaphyriinae
- Genus: Stegea; Munroe, 1964

Synonyms
- Egesta Ragonot, 1891

Genus of moths

Stegea is a genus of moths of the family Crambidae.

== Species ==
- Stegea clarkei
- Stegea eripalis Grote, 1878
- Stegea fiachnalis
- Stegea hermalis (Schaus, 1920)
- Stegea jamaicensis
- Stegea mexicana
- Stegea minutalis
- Stegea powelli
- Stegea salutalis
- Stegea simplicialis
- Stegea sola
