= Spatalistis egesta =

Scientific classification
- Kingdom: Animalia
- Phylum: Arthropoda
- Class: Insecta
- Order: Lepidoptera
- Family: Tortricidae
- Genus: Spatalistis
- Species: S. egesta

Binomial name
- Spatalistis egesta Razowski, 1974

Species of moth

Spatalistis egesta is a species of moth of the family Tortricidae. It is found in Japan (Honshu), the Russian Far East and China (Shanxi, Zhejiang).

The wingspan is 12–15 mm.

The larvae feed on Cornus controversa and Rhamnus costata.
