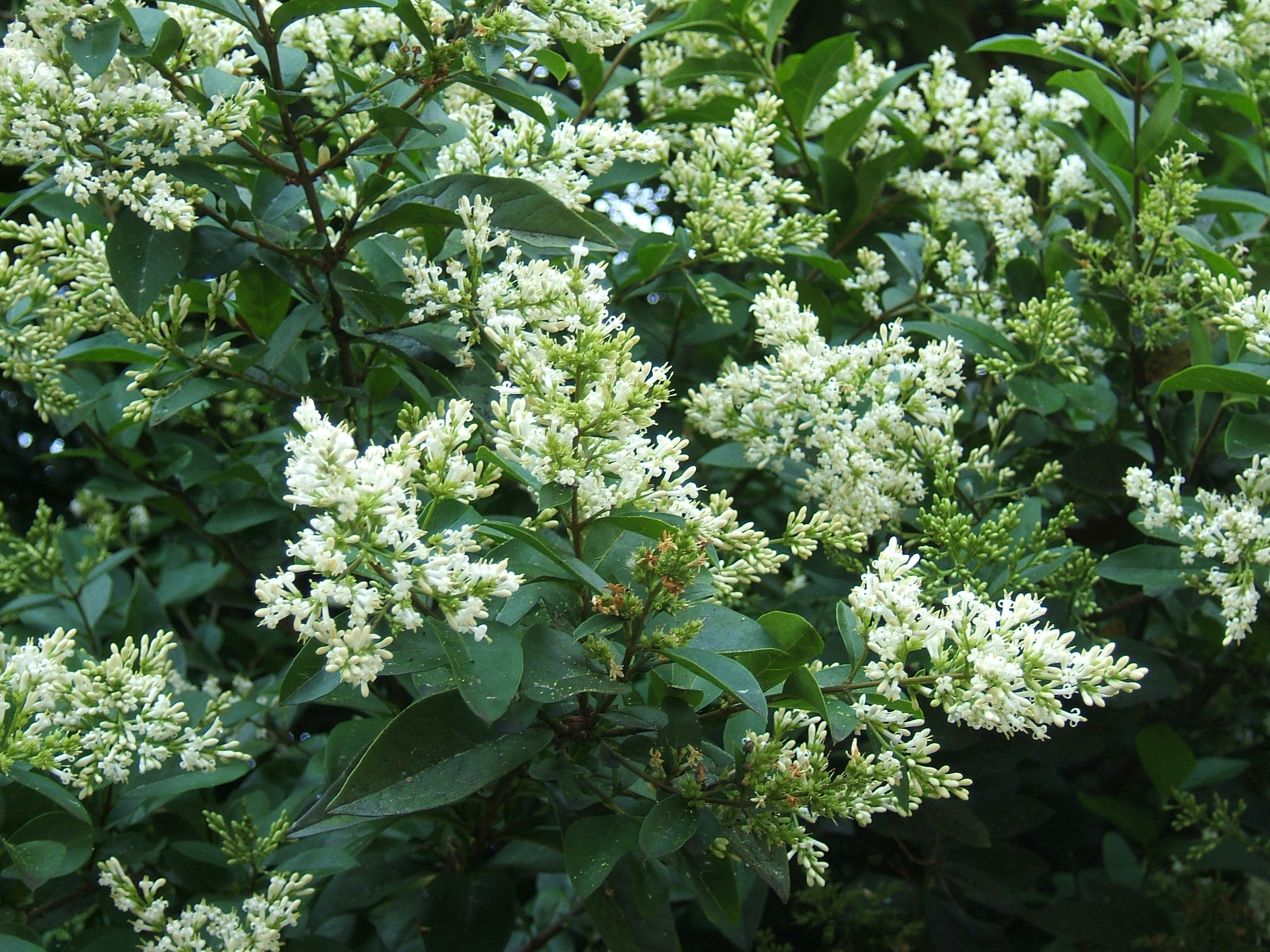

Scientific classification
- Kingdom: Plantae
- Clade: Tracheophytes
- Clade: Angiosperms
- Clade: Eudicots
- Clade: Asterids
- Order: Lamiales
- Family: Oleaceae
- Genus: Ligustrum
- Species: L. ovalifolium

Binomial name
- Ligustrum ovalifolium Hassk.

= Ligustrum ovalifolium =

Species of plant

Ligustrum ovalifolium, also known as Korean privet, California privet, garden privet, and oval-leaved privet, is a species of flowering plant in the olive family Oleaceae. The species is native to Japan and Korea.

== Description ==
Ligustrum ovalifolium is a dense, fast-growing, deciduous (evergreen/semi-evergreen in warm winter areas) shrub or small tree. It grows to 10–15 feet (3.0–4.6 m) tall and wide. Its thick, fleshy leaf is green on the top, and greenish-yellow on the underside.

It flowers in midsummer, the abundant white blooms producing a unique pungent fragrance, unpleasant to some. They are borne in panicles. They have four curled-back petals and two high stamens with yellow or red anthers, between which is the low pistil; the petals and stamens fall off after the flower is fertilized, leaving the pistil in the calyx tube. Flowering starts after 330 growing degree days.

The fruits, borne in clusters, are small purple to black drupes, poisonous for humans but readily eaten by many birds. In favorable growing conditions, individual shrubs may produce thousands of fruits.

== Uses ==
Ligustrum ovalifolium is used as a food plant by the larvae of some Lepidoptera species including common emerald, common marbled carpet, copper underwing, the engrailed, mottled beauty, scalloped hazel, small angle shades, the V-pug and willow beauty.

All parts of plant are poisonous if ingested by humans.

=== Cultivation ===
The species is widely cultivated as an ornamental plant in many countries, as a shrub, and grouped for an informal or formal hedge. Privets need to be trimmed several times during a growing season, in order to maintain a formal hedge shape. Regularly trimmed plants do not produce flowers or fruit.

Ligustrum ovalifolium is the most common hedging plant species in cultivation in the United Kingdom.

Several cultivars are used in gardens and for hedging, including Ligustrum ovalifolium 'Aureum', the golden privet, with oval, rich yellow leaves with green centers. In the UK it has gained the Royal Horticultural Society's Award of Garden Merit. With Ligustrum obtusifolium it is a parent of the hybrid Ligustrum × ibolium.

Ligustrum ovalifolium 'Vicaryi', a yellow-leaved shrub, was once thought to be a hybrid between L. ovalifolium 'Aureum' and Ligustrum vulgare, for which the name Ligustrum × vicaryi was published. Studies of both chloroplast and nuclear DNA showed that L. vulgare was not involved in its parentage, both of its parents being L. ovalifolium. Accordingly, it was given a cultivar name. Its year-round yellow leaves and white flowers in midsummer make it an attractive hedging plant or ornamental shrub.

== Naturalized—invasive species ==
The species is reportedly naturalized in France, Spain, Italy, the Balearic Islands, Saint Helena, Réunion, Chiapas (México), Costa Rica, Guatemala, Honduras, the Juan Fernandez Islands, Ontario, and in the United States.

Ligustrum ovalifolium has also been listed as an invasive species in areas of the United States, including: California, Hawaii, Washington state, Texas, Missouri, Alabama, and many of the Mid-Atlantic and Northeastern states. 46 states have it listed on their noxious weed lists.

== Etymology ==
Ligustrum means "binder". It was named by Pliny and Virgil. The Latin specific epithet ovalifolium means "oval-leaved".
