= Stegea minutalis =

Scientific classification
- Kingdom: Animalia
- Phylum: Arthropoda
- Class: Insecta
- Order: Lepidoptera
- Family: Crambidae
- Genus: Stegea
- Species: S. minutalis

Binomial name
- Stegea minutalis (Walter, 1928)

Synonyms
- Egesta minutalis Walter, 1928

Species of moth

Stegea minutalis is a moth in the family Crambidae. It is found in North America, where it has been recorded from Arizona.
