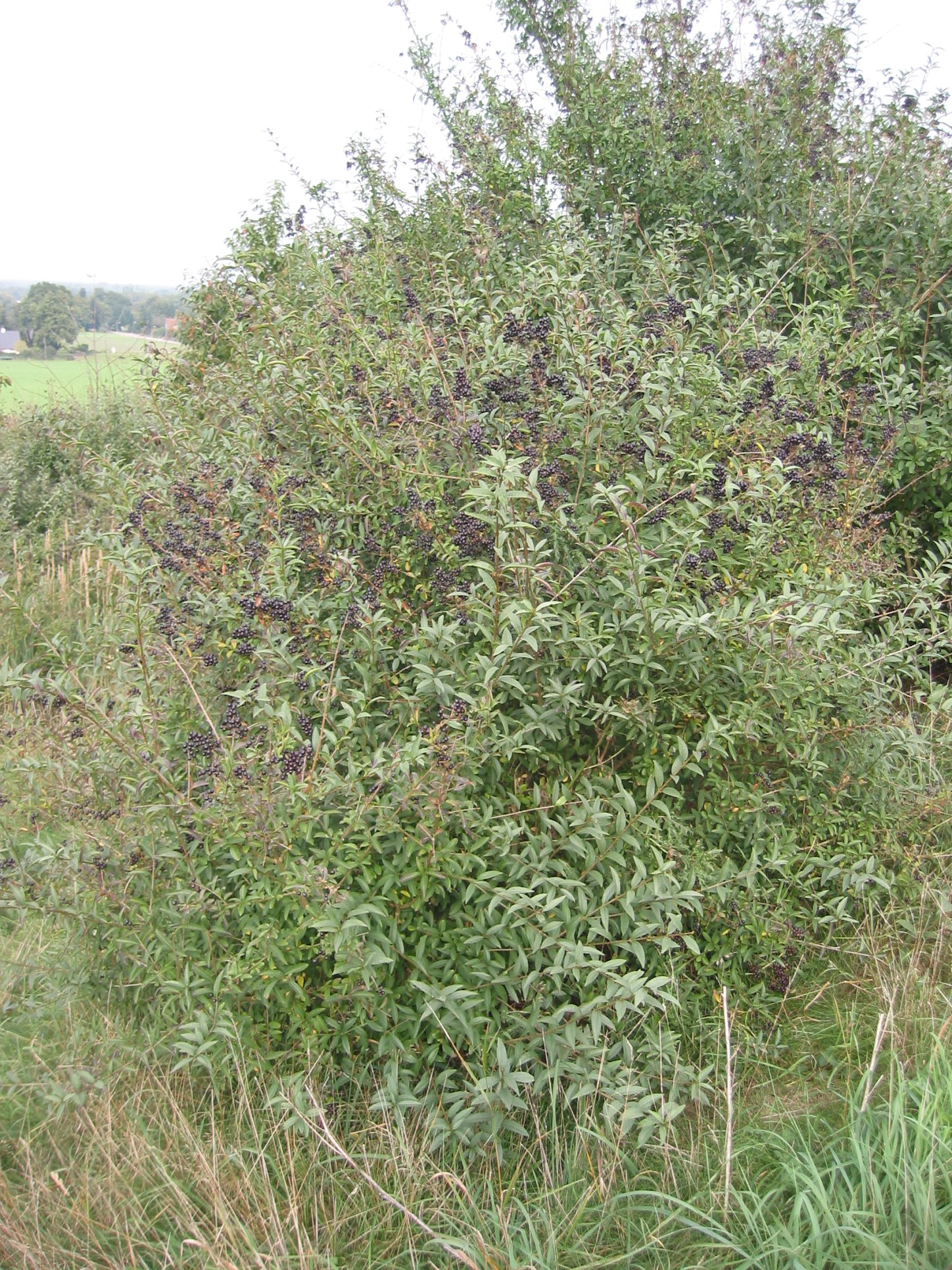

Scientific classification
- Kingdom: Plantae
- Clade: Tracheophytes
- Clade: Angiosperms
- Clade: Eudicots
- Clade: Asterids
- Order: Lamiales
- Family: Oleaceae
- Genus: Ligustrum
- Species: L. vulgare

Binomial name
- Ligustrum vulgare L.

Synonyms
- List: Ligustrum album Gueldenst.; Ligustrum angustifolium Gilib.; Ligustrum decipiens Gand.; Ligustrum insulare Decne.; Ligustrum insulense Decne.; Ligustrum italicum Mill.; Ligustrum lodense Glogau; Ligustrum oviforme Gand.; Ligustrum sempervirens (Gray) Lindl.; Ligustrum vicinum Gand.; Olea humilis Salisb.

= Ligustrum vulgare =

Plant species in the olive family

Ligustrum vulgare (wild privet, also sometimes known as common privet or European privet) is a species of Ligustrum native to central and southern Europe, north Africa and southwestern Asia, from Ireland and southwestern Sweden south to Morocco, and east to Poland and northwestern Iran.

== Description ==
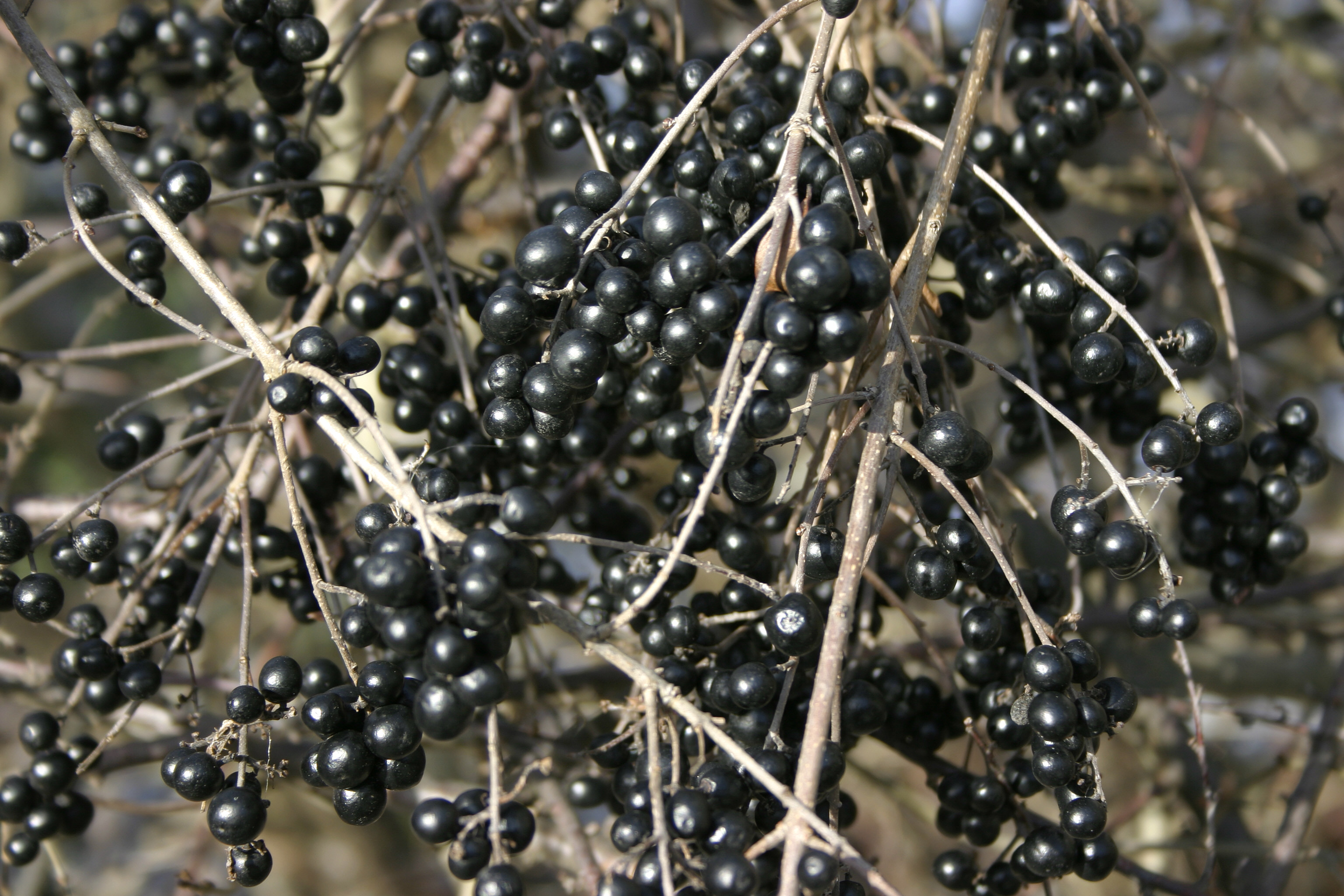
Berries

It is a semi-evergreen or deciduous shrub, growing to 3 m (rarely up to 5 m) tall. The stems are stiff, erect, with grey-brown bark spotted with small brown lenticels. The leaves are borne in decussate opposite pairs, sub-shiny green, narrow oval to lanceolate, 2–6 cm long and 0.5–1.5 cm broad. The flowers are produced in mid-summer in panicles 3–6 cm long, each flower creamy-white, with a tubular base and a four-lobed corolla ('petals') 4–6 mm diameter. The flowers produce a strong, pungent fragrance that many people find unpleasant. The fruit is a small glossy black berry 6–8 mm diameter, containing one to four seeds. The berries are poisonous to humans but readily eaten by thrushes, which disperse the seeds in their droppings.

Plants from the warmer parts of the range show a stronger tendency to be fully evergreen; these have sometimes been treated as a separate variety Ligustrum vulgare var. italicum (Mill.) Vahl, but others do not regard it as distinct.

== Cultivation and uses ==
In the British Isles it is the only native privet, common in hedgerows and woodlands in southern England and Wales, especially in chalk areas; it is less common in northern England, Scotland, and Northern Ireland, where it only occurs as an escapee from cultivation.

The species was used for hedging in Elizabethan gardens in England, but was superseded by the more reliably evergreen introduction L. ovalifolium from Japan.

A number of cultivars have been selected, including:

- 'Aureum' – yellow leaves.
- 'Buxifolium' – small, oval leaves not over 2.5 cm long.
- 'Cheyenne' – cold-tolerant clone selected in North America.
- 'Chlorocarpum' - berries green.
- 'Insulense' – long, narrow leaves 5–11 cm long and 1–2.5 cm broad.
- 'Leucocarpum' – berries greenish-white.
- 'Lodense' – dense, dwarf shrub (the name is a portmanteau of 'low' and 'dense').
- 'Pyramidale' – fastigiate.
- 'Xanthocarpum' – berries yellow.

== Invasiveness ==
The species is listed as invasive as an introduced plant in Australia, Canada, New Zealand, and the United States. It is also fully naturalised in Mexico's highlands and Argentina.

== Etymology ==
Ligustrum means 'binder'. It was named by Pliny and Virgil.

== Gallery ==
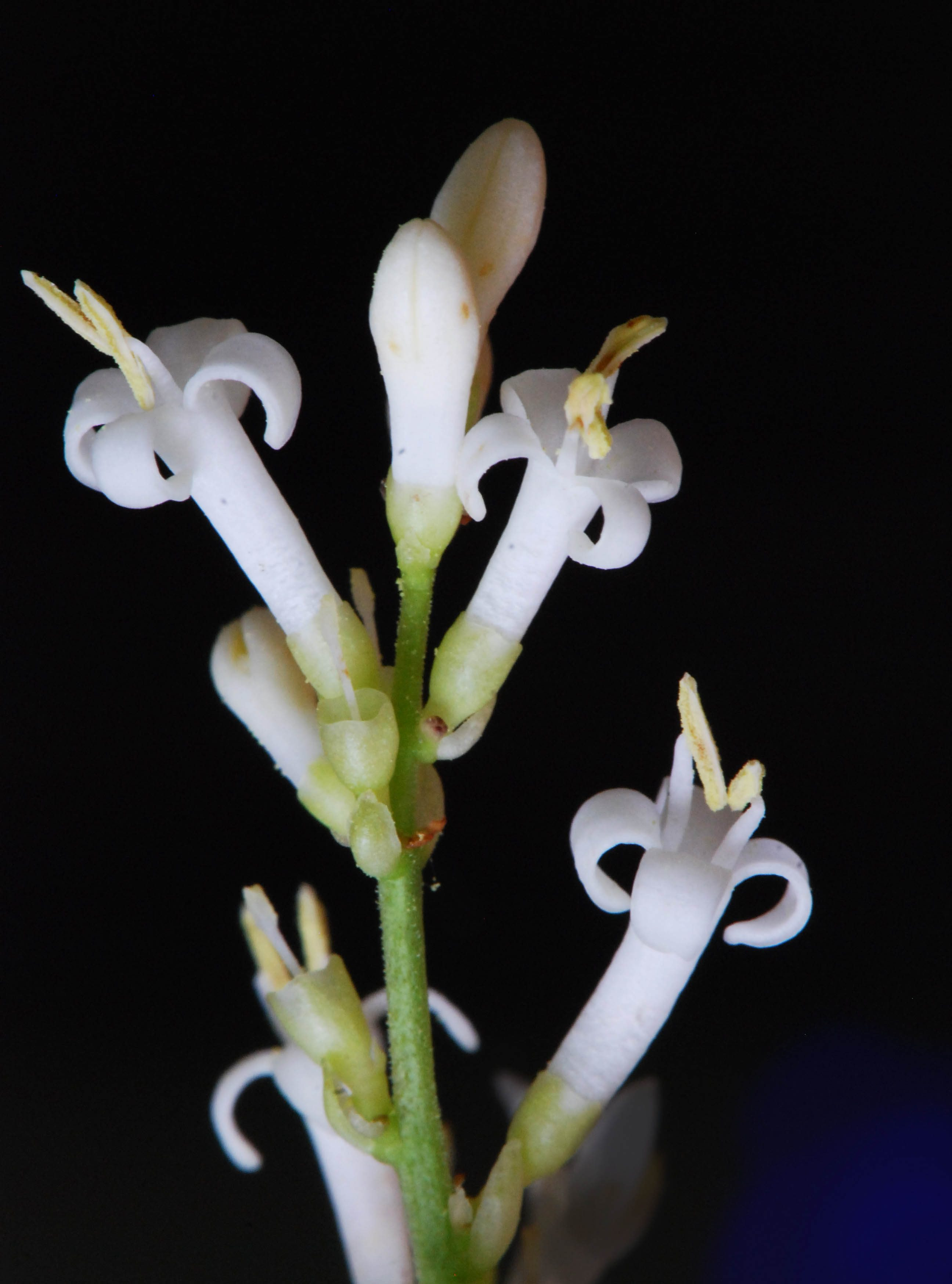

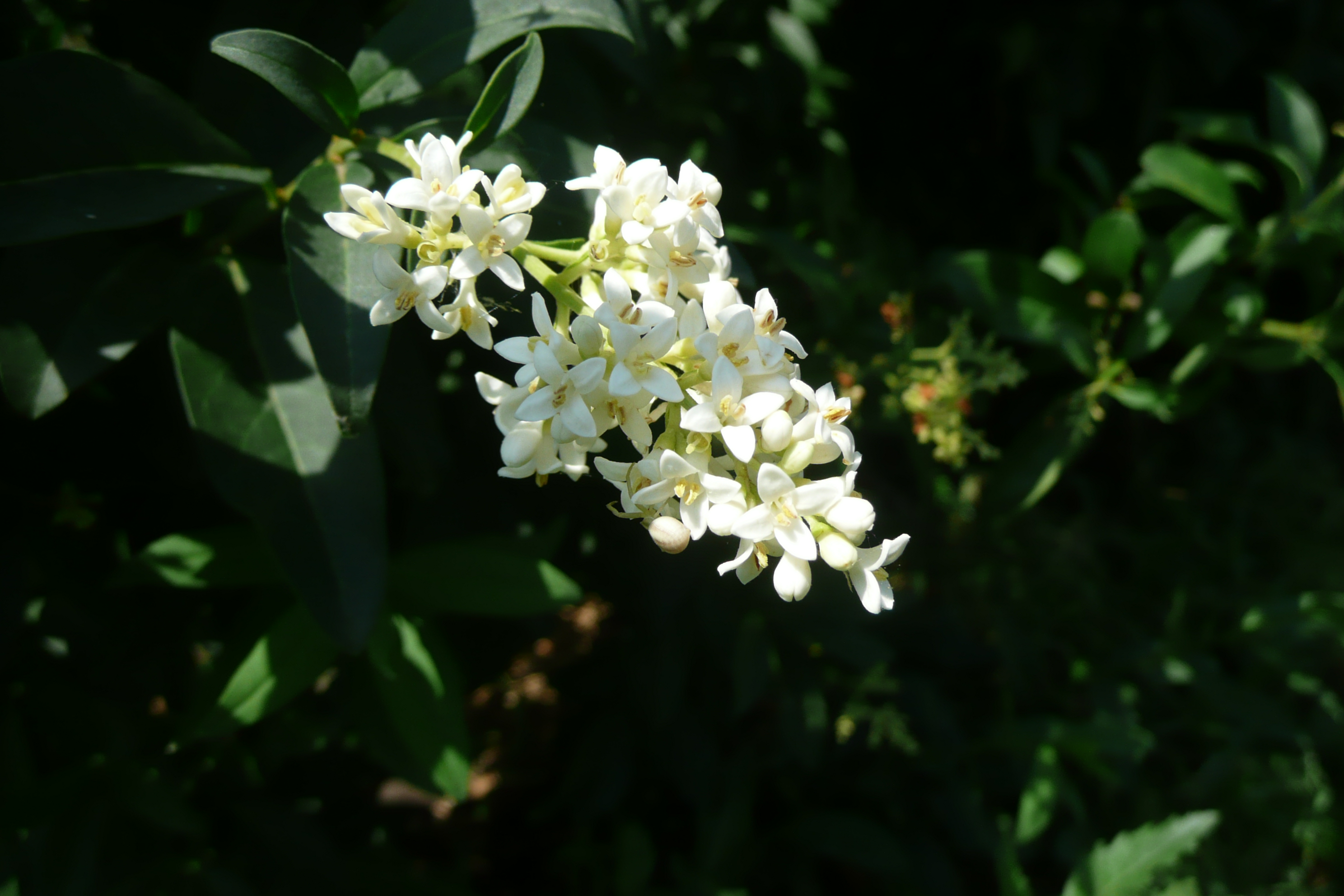

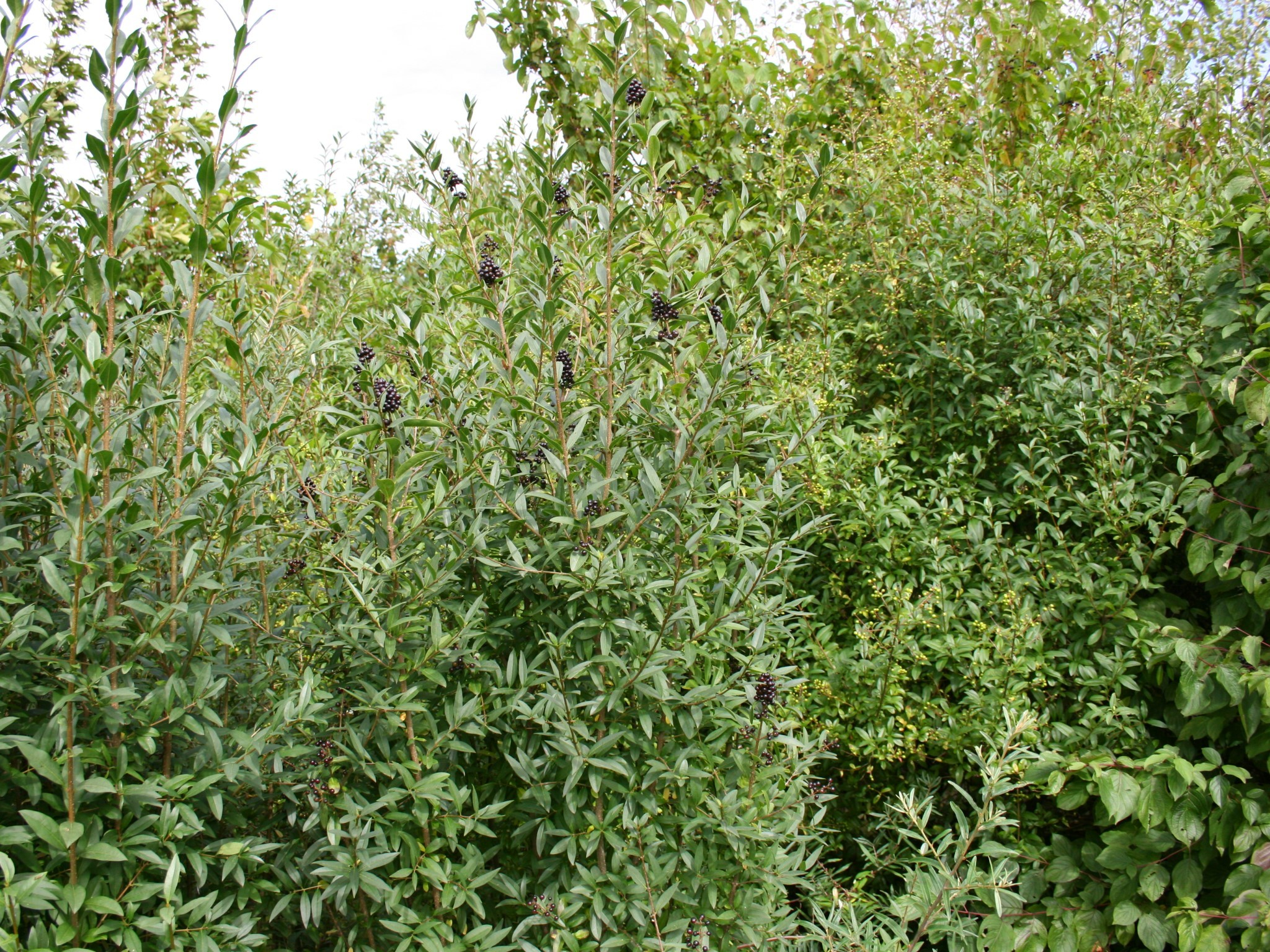

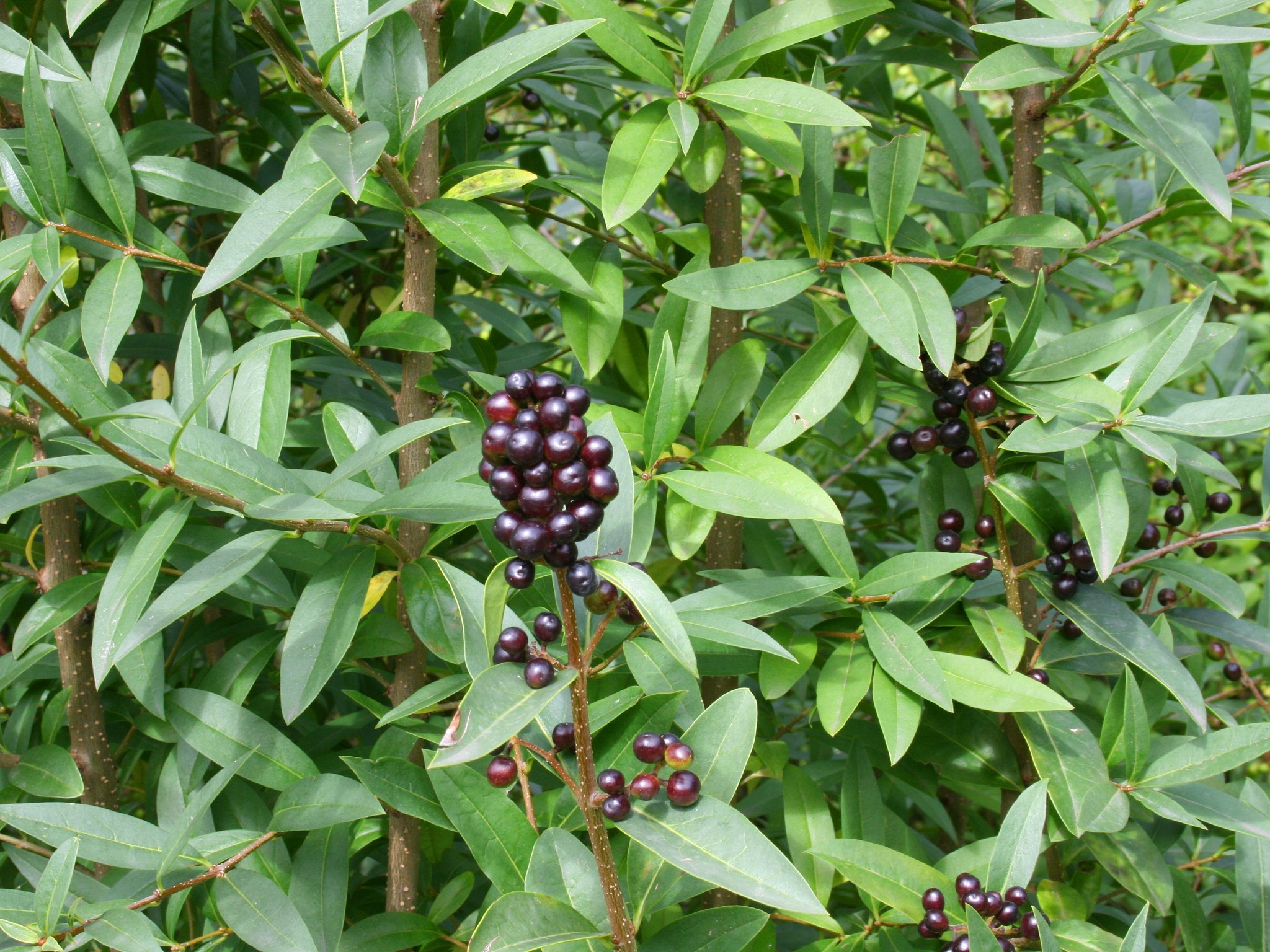

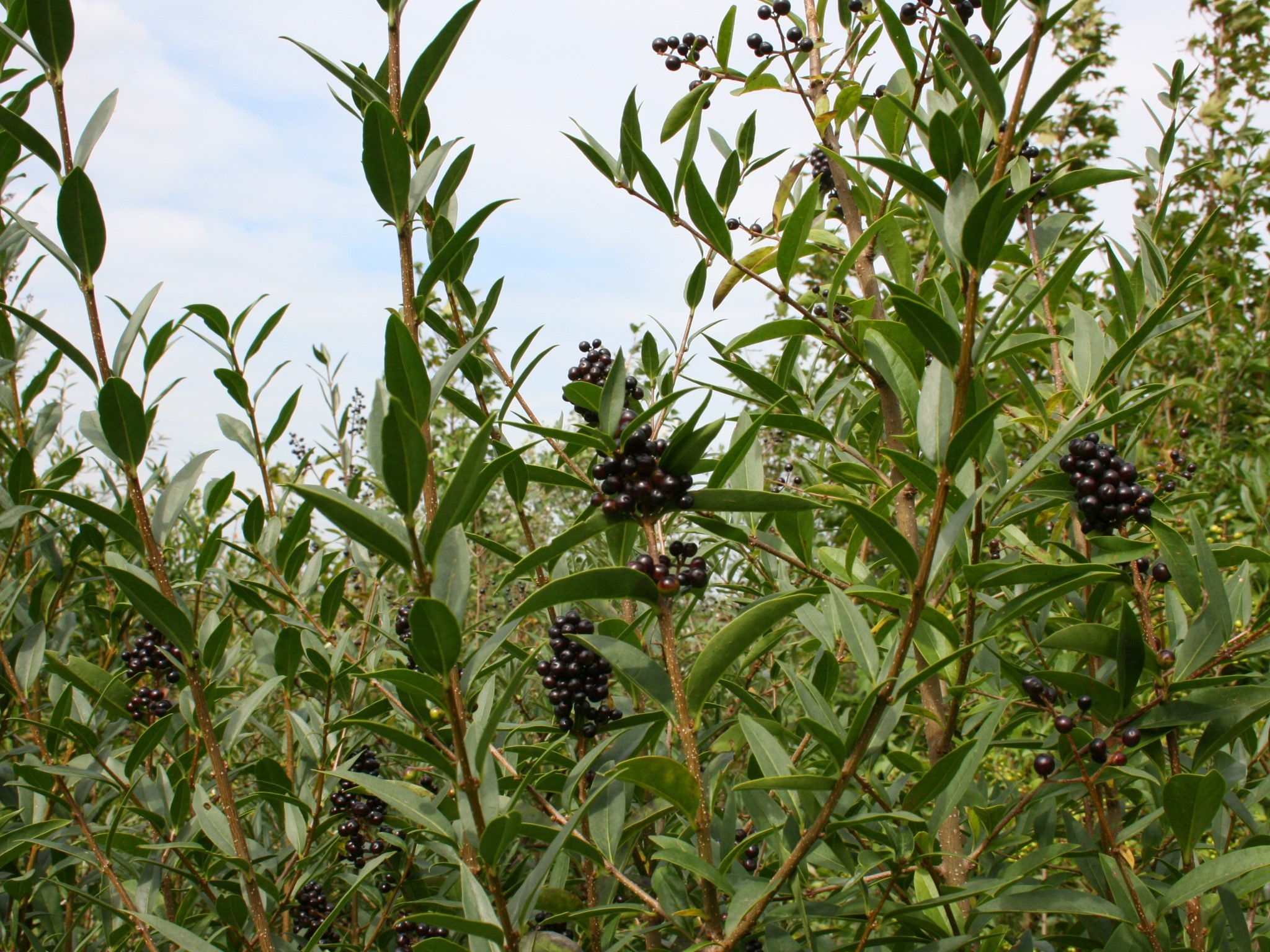

== See also ==
- Privet as an invasive plant
