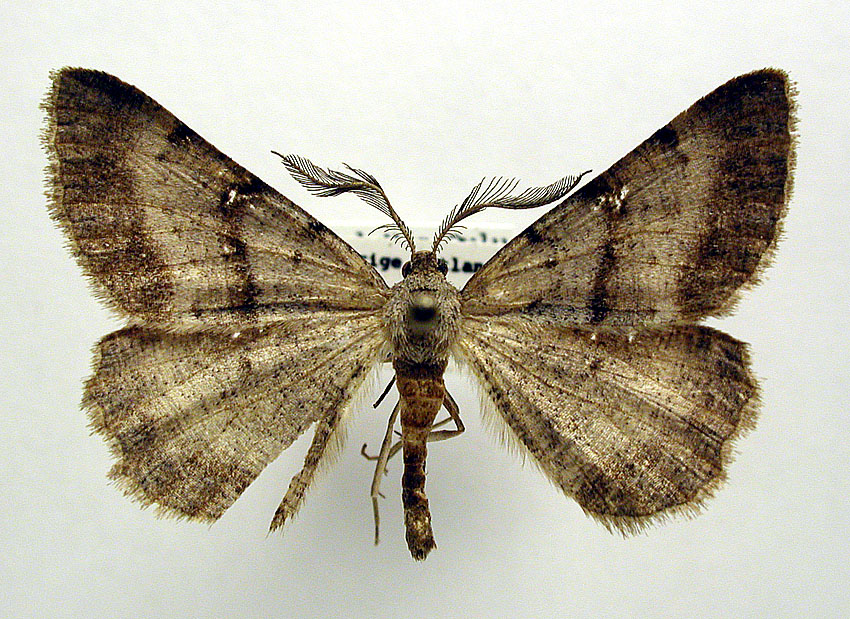
- Selidosema brunnearia

Scientific classification
- Kingdom: Animalia
- Phylum: Arthropoda
- Clade: Pancrustacea
- Class: Insecta
- Order: Lepidoptera
- Family: Geometridae
- Subfamily: Ennominae
- Tribe: Boarmiini
- Genus: Selidosema; Hübner, 1823

= Selidosema =

Genus of moths

Selidosema is a genus of moths in the family Geometridae first described by Jacob Hübner in 1823.

== Species ==
- Selidosema agoraea Meyrick, 1892
- Selidosema ambustaria (Geyer, 1831)
- Selidosema brunnearia (Villers, 1889)
- Selidosema erebaria Oberthür, 1883 (formerly in Menophra or Peribatodes)
- Selidosema modestarium (Püngeler, 1914)
- Selidosema parenzani Hausmann, 1993
- Selidosema plumaria (Denis & Schiffermüller, 1775)
- Selidosema taeniolaria (Hübner, 1813)
