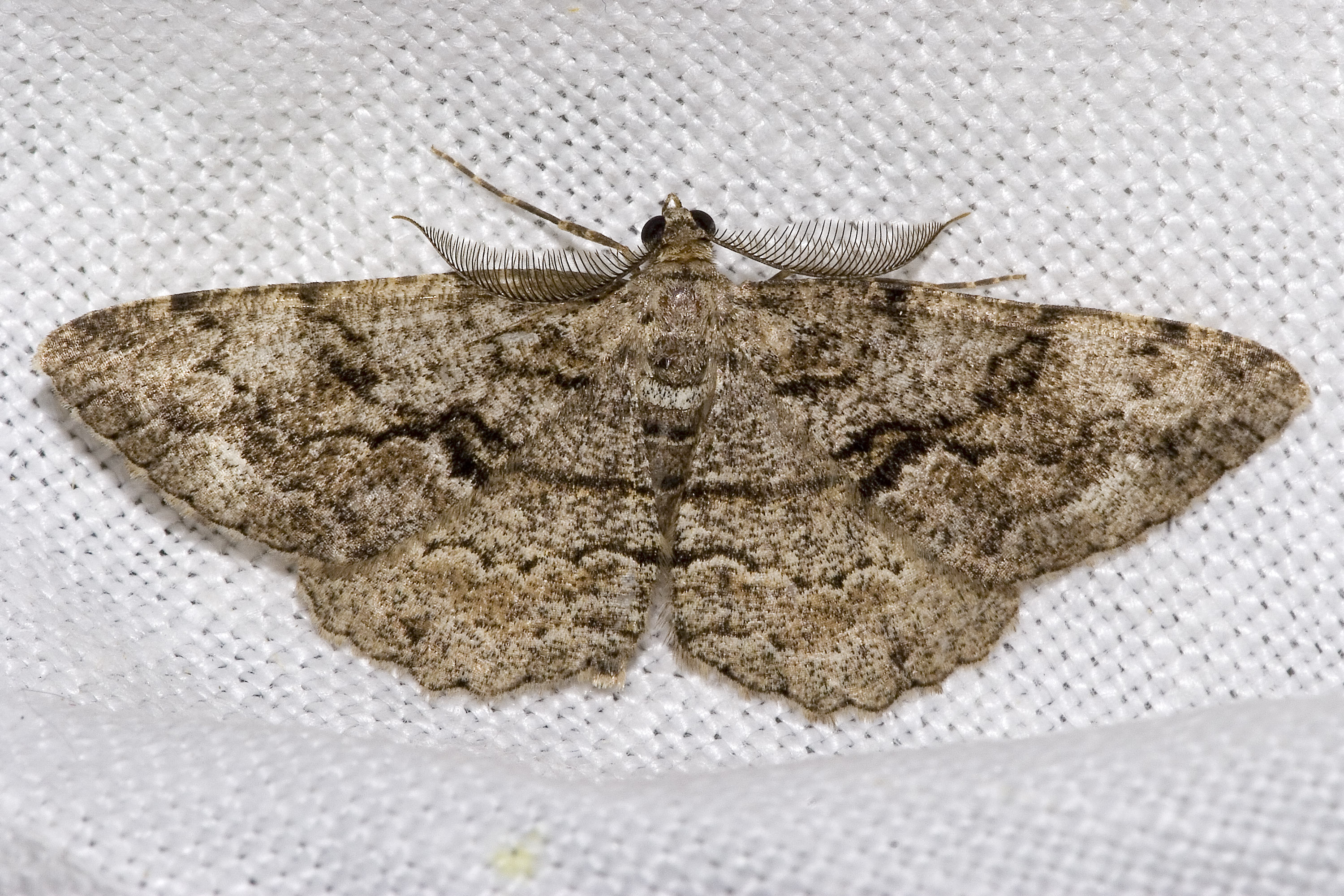

Scientific classification
- Domain: Eukaryota
- Kingdom: Animalia
- Phylum: Arthropoda
- Class: Insecta
- Order: Lepidoptera
- Family: Geometridae
- Genus: Peribatodes
- Species: P. secundaria

Binomial name
- Peribatodes secundaria (Denis & Schiffermüller, 1775)

Synonyms
- Geometra secundaria Denis & Schiffermüller, 1775; Boarmia druentiaria Cleu, 1928

= Peribatodes secundaria =

Species of moth

Peribatodes secundaria, the feathered beauty, is a moth of the family Geometridae. The species was first described by Michael Denis and Ignaz Schiffermüller in 1775. It can be found in Europe.

The wingspan is 38–44 mm. The length of the forewings is 17–20 mm. The wing ground colour is grey variously mixed with light brown. The median crossband is dark and partially interrupted. Near the wing outer edge in the middle a light spot is sometimes recognizable. The antennae of the males are strongly feathered in contrast to the filament-shaped of the females.

Peribatodes secundaria is difficult to certainly distinguish from its congeners Peribatodes rhomboidaria ([Denis & Schiffermüller], 1775), Peribatodes ilicaria (Geyer, 1833), Deileptenia ribeata (Clerck, 1759) and Alcis repandata (Linnaeus, 1758)

The moth flies in one generation from mid-June to mid-August.

The larva feeds on various coniferous trees, such as the Norway spruce.

== Notes ==
1. The flight season refers to Belgium and the Netherlands. This may vary in other parts of the range.
