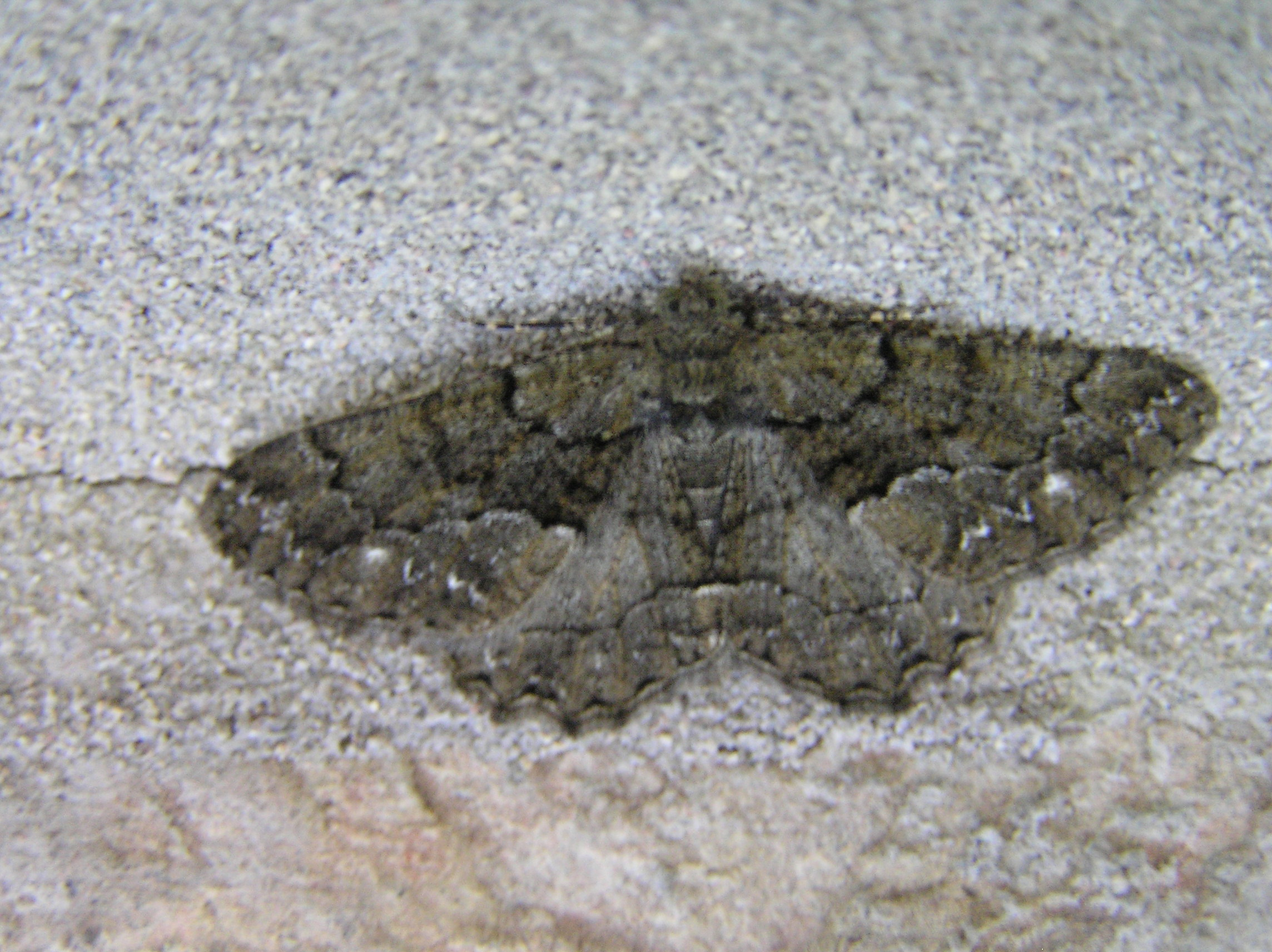

Scientific classification
- Domain: Eukaryota
- Kingdom: Animalia
- Phylum: Arthropoda
- Class: Insecta
- Order: Lepidoptera
- Family: Geometridae
- Genus: Peribatodes
- Species: P. ilicaria

Binomial name
- Peribatodes ilicaria (Geyer, 1833)

Synonyms
- Geometra ilicaria Geyer, 1833; Boarmia manuelaria Herrich-Schäffer, 1852; Boarmia marinaria Cleu, 1928

= Peribatodes ilicaria =

Species of moth

Peribatodes ilicaria, the Lydd beauty, is a moth of the family Geometridae. The species was first described by Carl Geyer in 1833. It can be found in Europe and North Africa.

The wingspan is about 30 mm. Peribatodes ilicaria is difficult to certainly distinguish from its congeners. See Townsend et al.

- Peribatodes rhomboidaria ([Denis & Schiffermüller], 1775)
- Peribatodes secundaria ([Denis & Schiffermüller], 1775)
- Deileptenia ribeata (Clerck, 1759)
- Alcis repandata (Linnaeus, 1758)

All are grey brown with a darker cross band and lines variously developed.

The moths fly from July to September depending on the location.

The larvae feed on various trees and shrubs.
