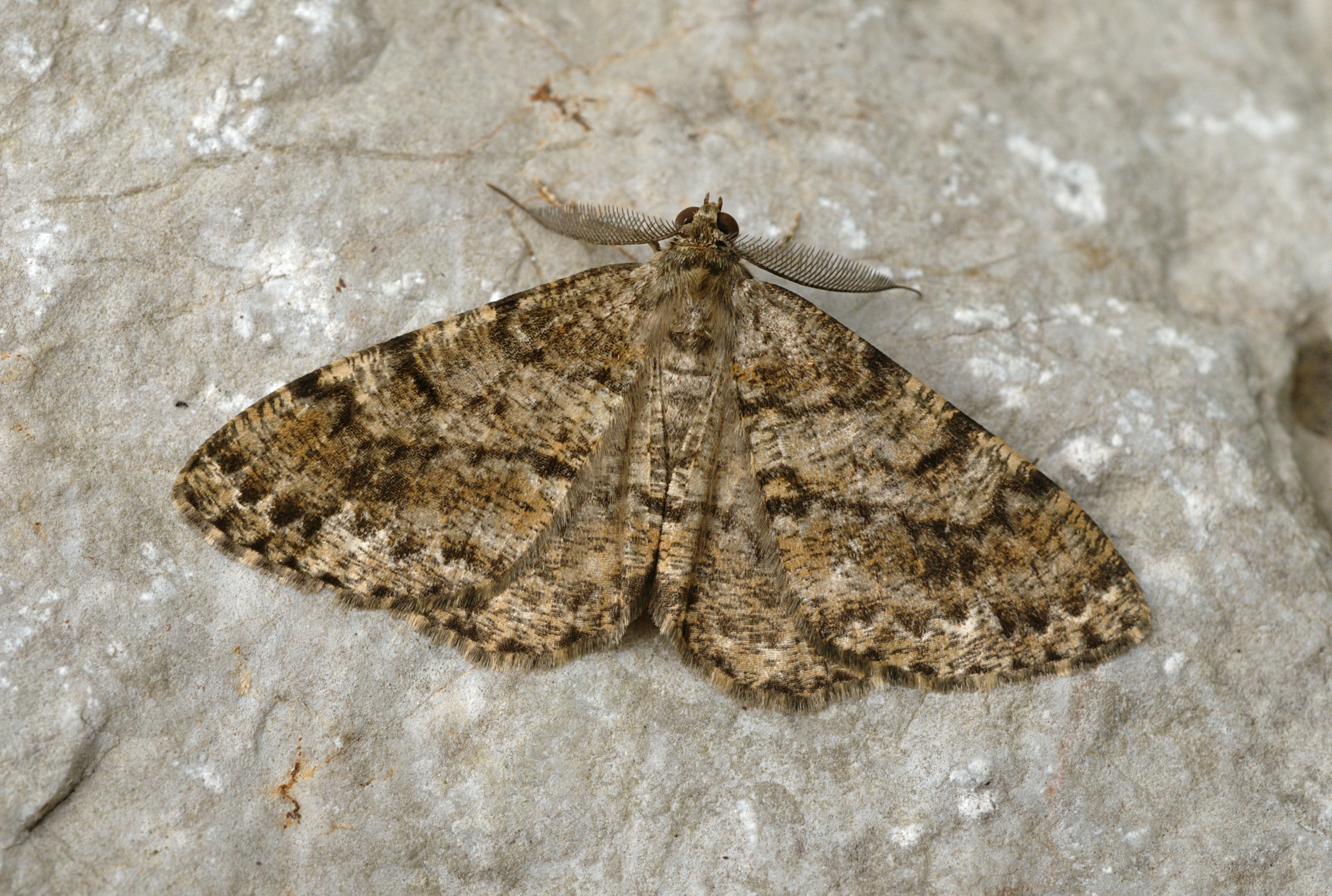

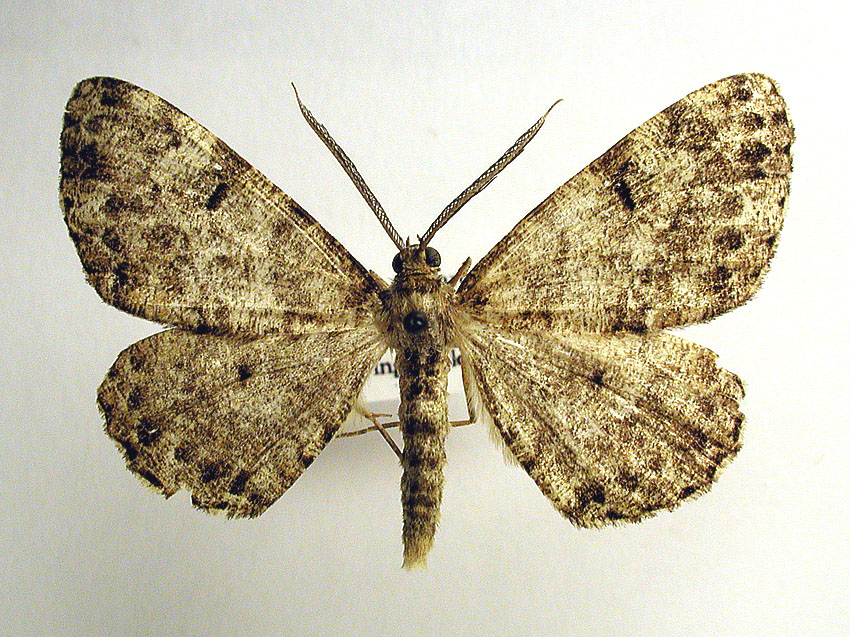

Scientific classification
- Kingdom: Animalia
- Phylum: Arthropoda
- Class: Insecta
- Order: Lepidoptera
- Family: Geometridae
- Genus: Deileptenia
- Species: D. ribeata

Binomial name
- Deileptenia ribeata (Clerck, 1759)

= Deileptenia ribeata =

Satin beauty

Species of moth

Deileptenia ribeata, the satin beauty, is a moth of the family Geometridae. The species was first described by Carl Alexander Clerck in 1759. It is found from Ireland, east through central Europe to Russia and Japan.

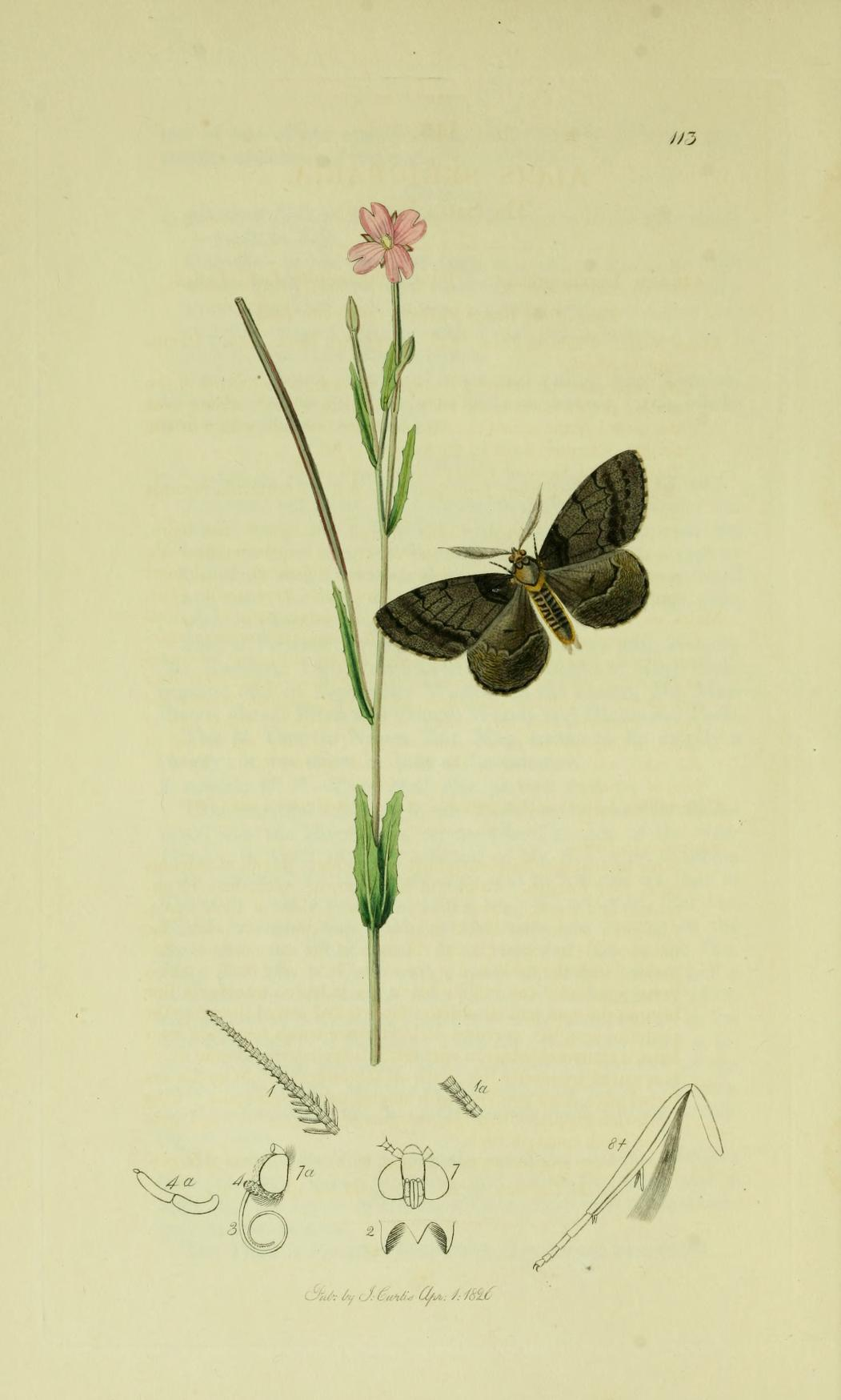
Illustration from John Curtis's British Entomology Volume 6

The wingspan is 30–40 mm. The forewing ground colour is usually mid to dark brown and the forewings have a slight mottled appearance. Very similar to the mottled beauty (Alcis repandata), Peribatodes rhomboidaria, Peribatodes secundaria and Peribatodes ilicaria See Townsend et al.

Adults are on wing from June to August. There is one generation per year.

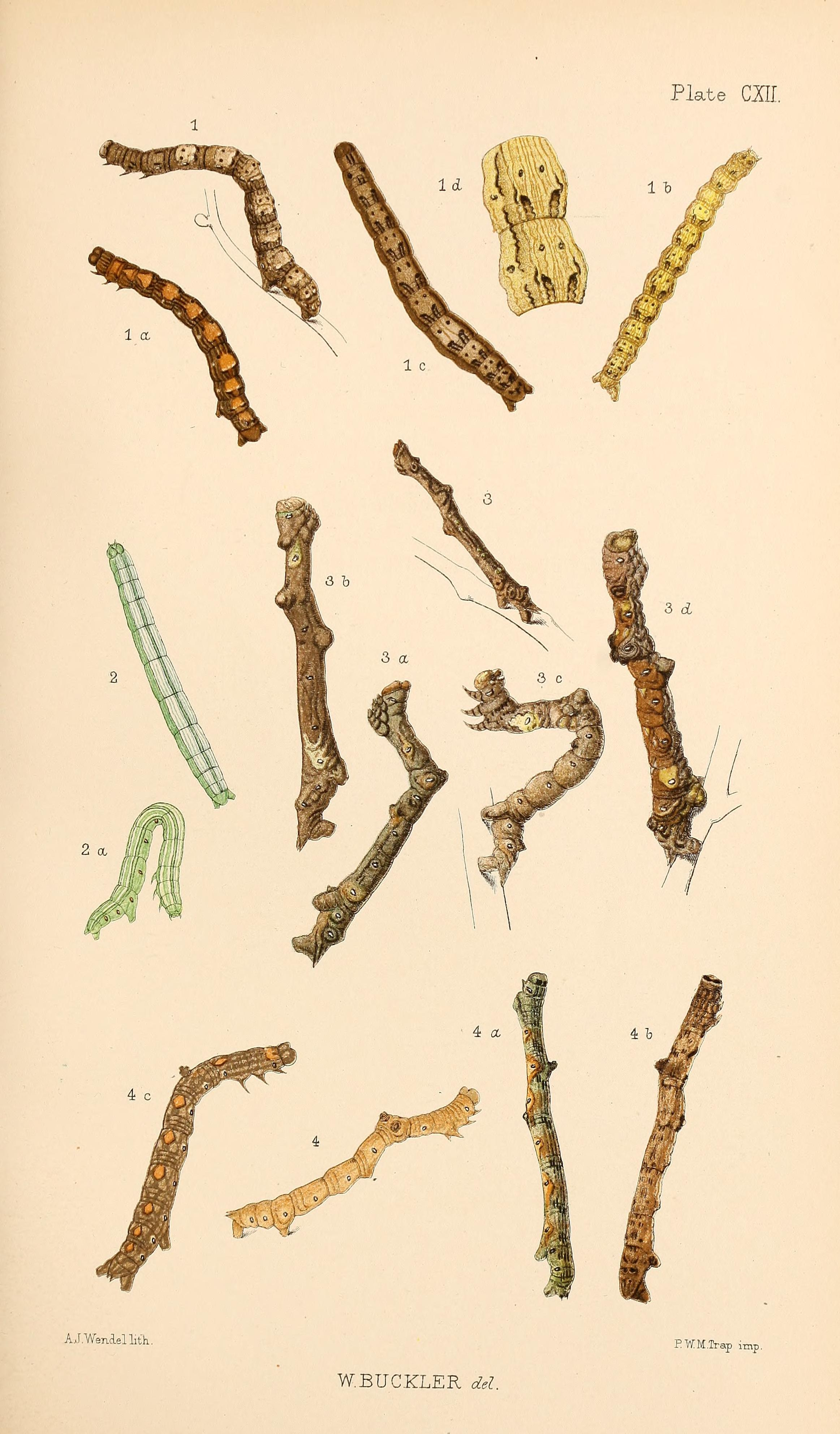
Figs. 1,1a,1b,1cLarvae in various stages 1d enlargement of portion

Larvae feed on various coniferous trees, including Taxus baccata, Abies alba, Carpinus betulus, Betula, Quercus, Prunus spinosa, Vaccinium uliginosum, Lonicera xylosteum and Picea.
