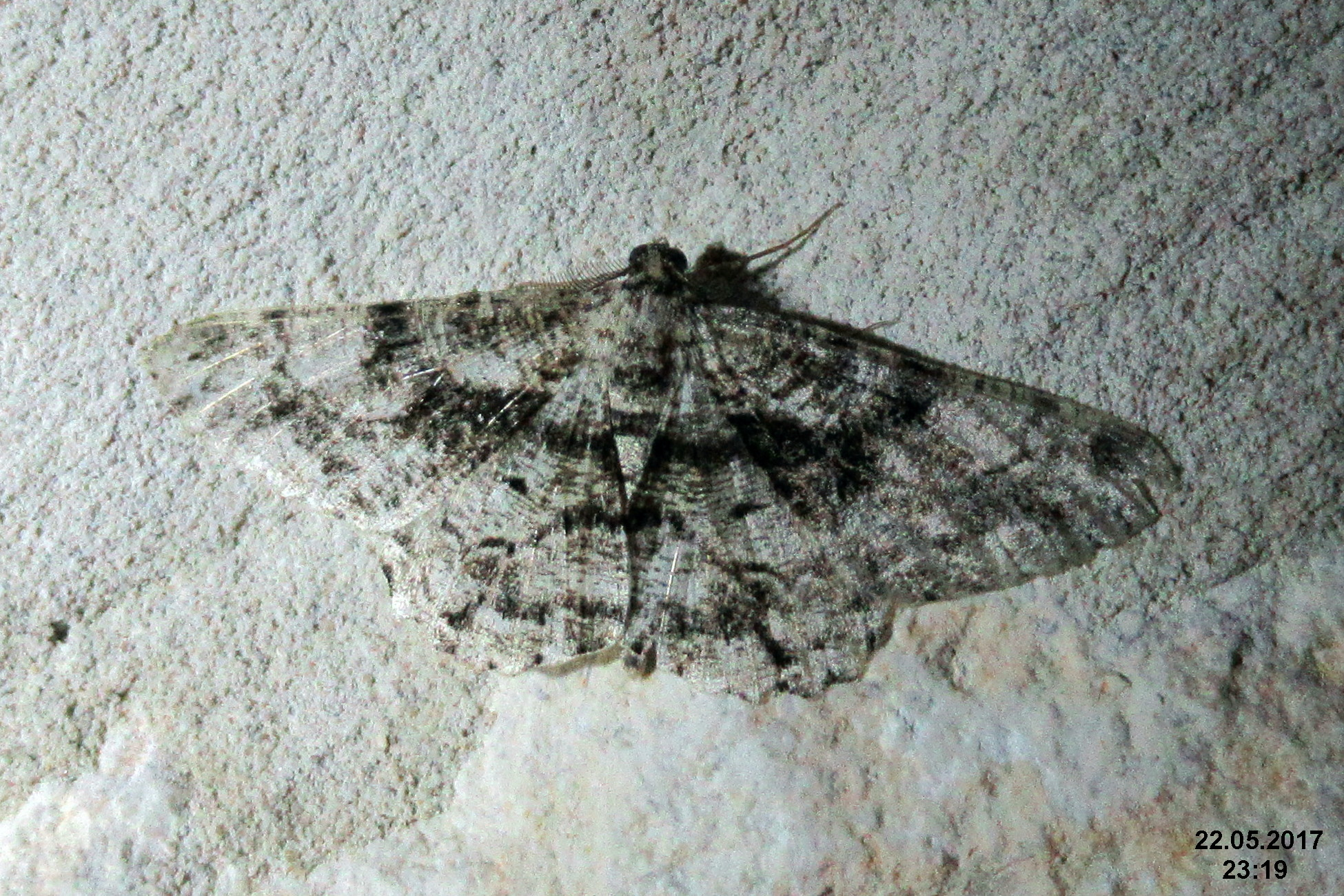

Scientific classification
- Domain: Eukaryota
- Kingdom: Animalia
- Phylum: Arthropoda
- Class: Insecta
- Order: Lepidoptera
- Family: Geometridae
- Genus: Peribatodes
- Species: P. umbraria

Binomial name
- Peribatodes umbraria (Hübner, 1809)

= Peribatodes umbraria =

Species of moth

Peribatodes umbraria, the olive-tree beauty, is a moth of the family Geometridae. The species was first described by Jacob Hübner in 1809. It can be found in southern Europe.

The wingspan is about 43 mm.

The larva feeds on oak.
