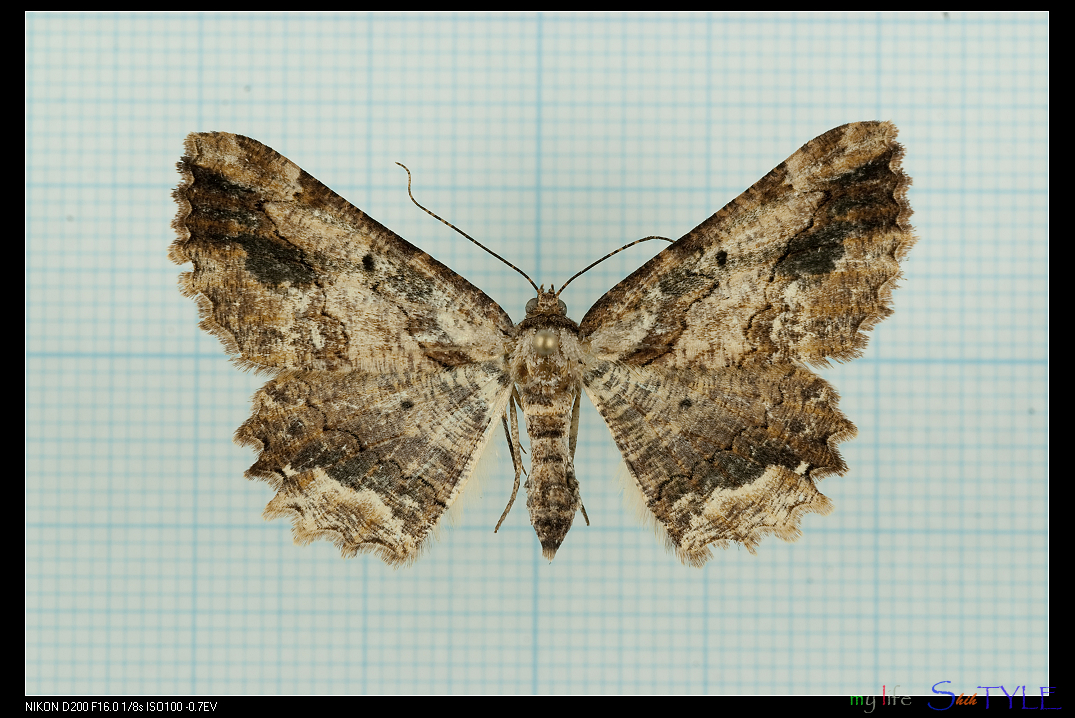

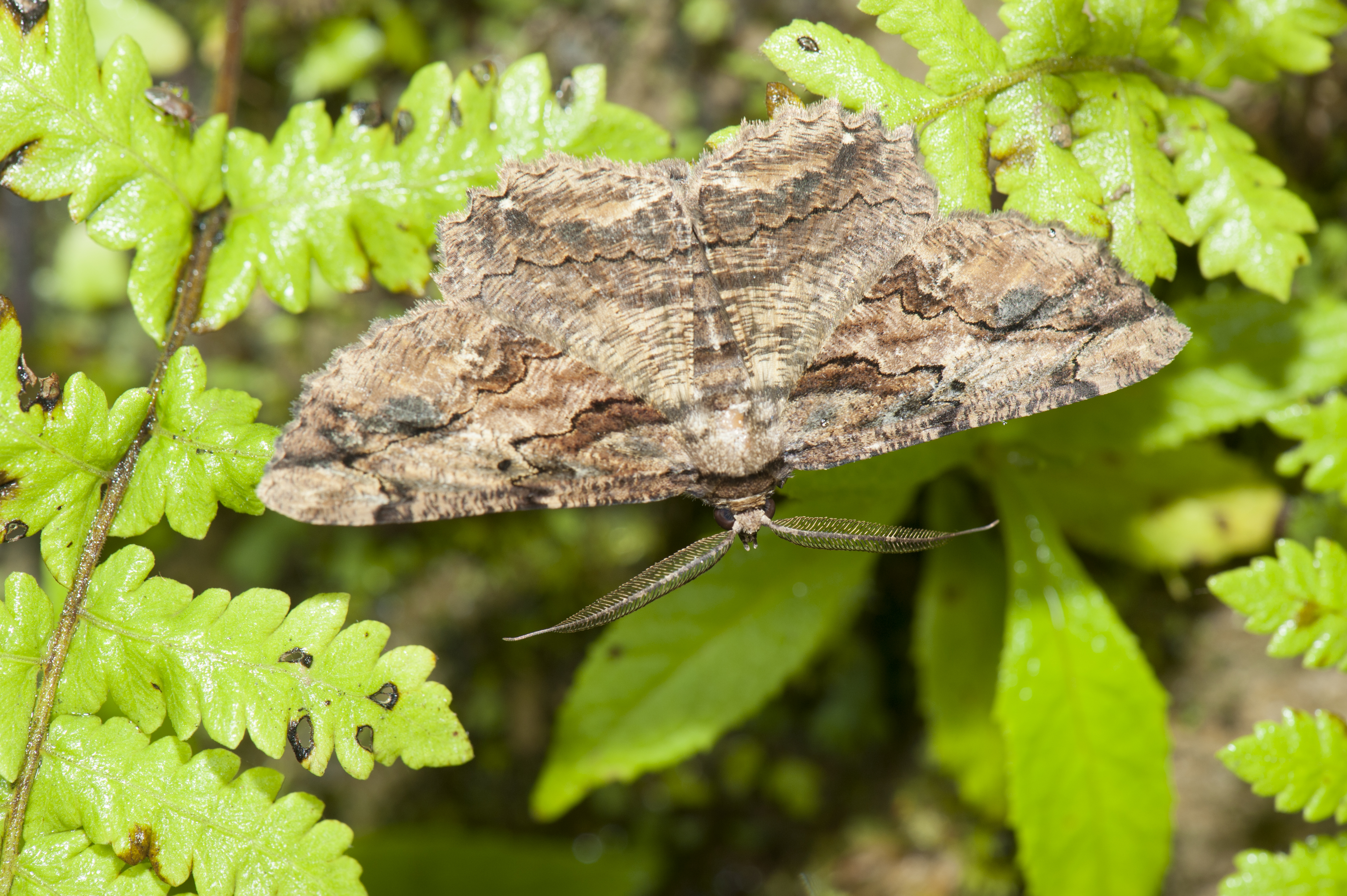

Scientific classification
- Domain: Eukaryota
- Kingdom: Animalia
- Phylum: Arthropoda
- Class: Insecta
- Order: Lepidoptera
- Family: Geometridae
- Genus: Menophra
- Species: M. anaplagiata

Binomial name
- Menophra anaplagiata Sato, 1984

= Menophra anaplagiata =

Species of moth

Menophra anaplagiata is a moth in the family Geometridae. It is found in China and Taiwan.
