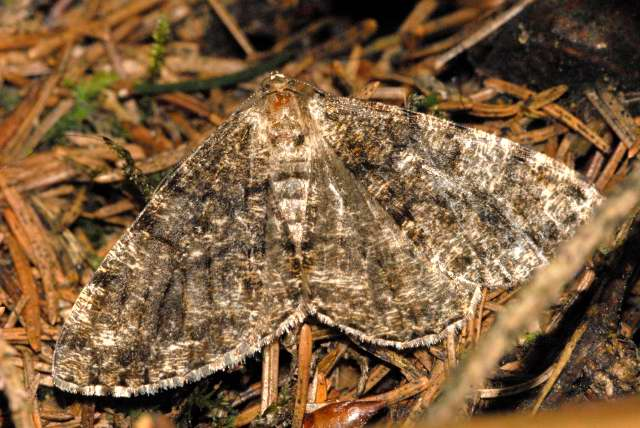

Scientific classification
- Kingdom: Animalia
- Phylum: Arthropoda
- Clade: Pancrustacea
- Class: Insecta
- Order: Lepidoptera
- Family: Geometridae
- Tribe: Boarmiini
- Genus: Deileptenia; Hübner, 1825

= Deileptenia =

Genus of moths

Deileptenia is a genus of moths in the family Geometridae.

== Species ==
- Deileptenia mandschuriaria Bremer, 1864
- Deileptenia ribeata – satin beauty (Clerck, 1759)
