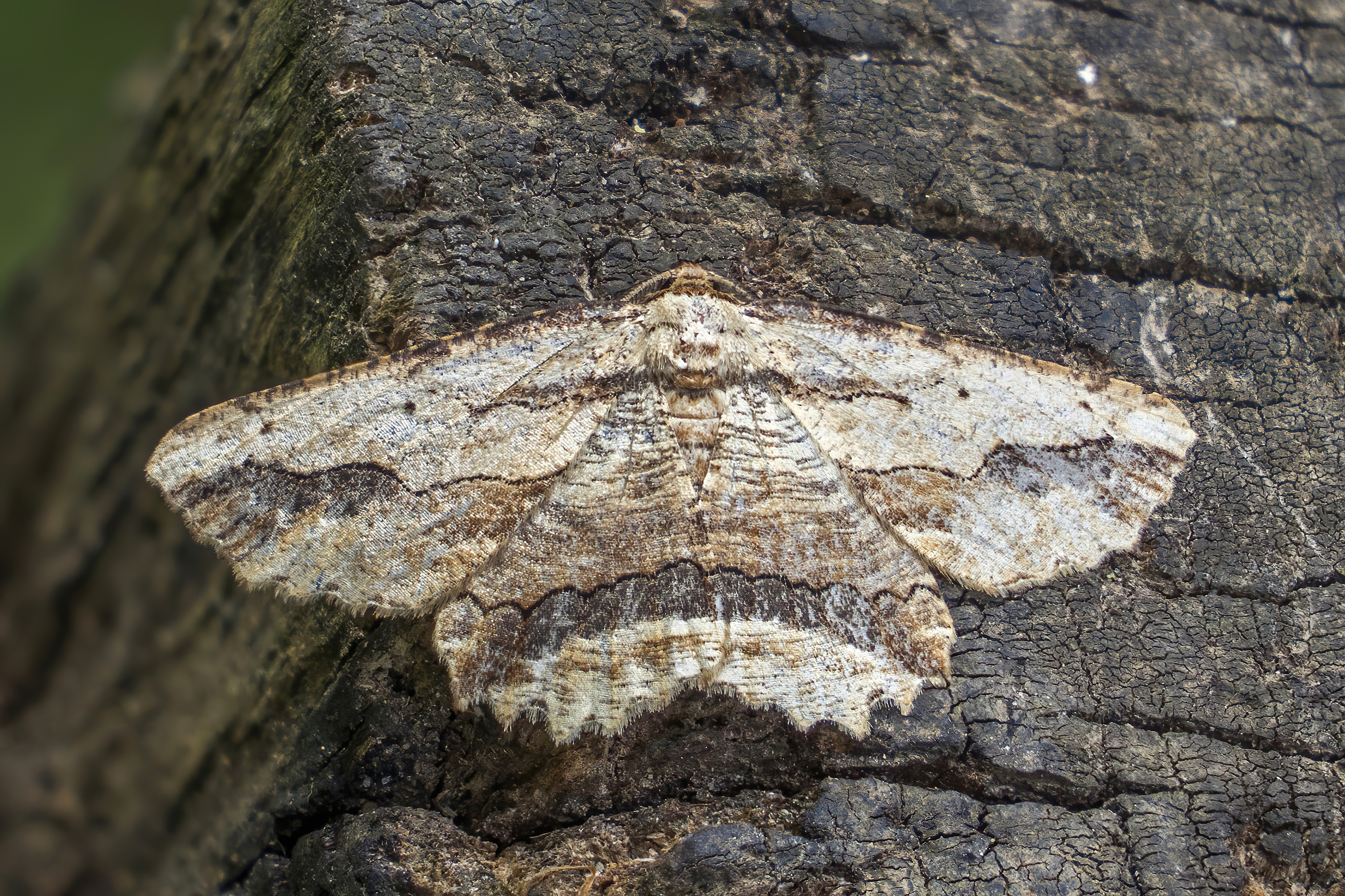

Scientific classification
- Domain: Eukaryota
- Kingdom: Animalia
- Phylum: Arthropoda
- Class: Insecta
- Order: Lepidoptera
- Family: Geometridae
- Genus: Menophra
- Species: M. abruptaria

Binomial name
- Menophra abruptaria (Thunberg, 1792)

Synonyms
- Phalaena abruptaria Thunberg, 1792

= Menophra abruptaria =

Species of moth

Menophra abruptaria, the waved umber, is a moth of the family Geometridae. The species was first described by Carl Peter Thunberg in 1792. It is found in south-western North Africa, southern Europe and Anatolia; in the north, it is found from England to Switzerland, south-western Germany, Bangladesh . The wingspan is 36–42 mm. Adults are on wing from April to June. Normally, there is one generation per year, although there can be a partial second generation in summer.

The larvae feed on Ligustrum ovalifolium and Syringa vulgaris.

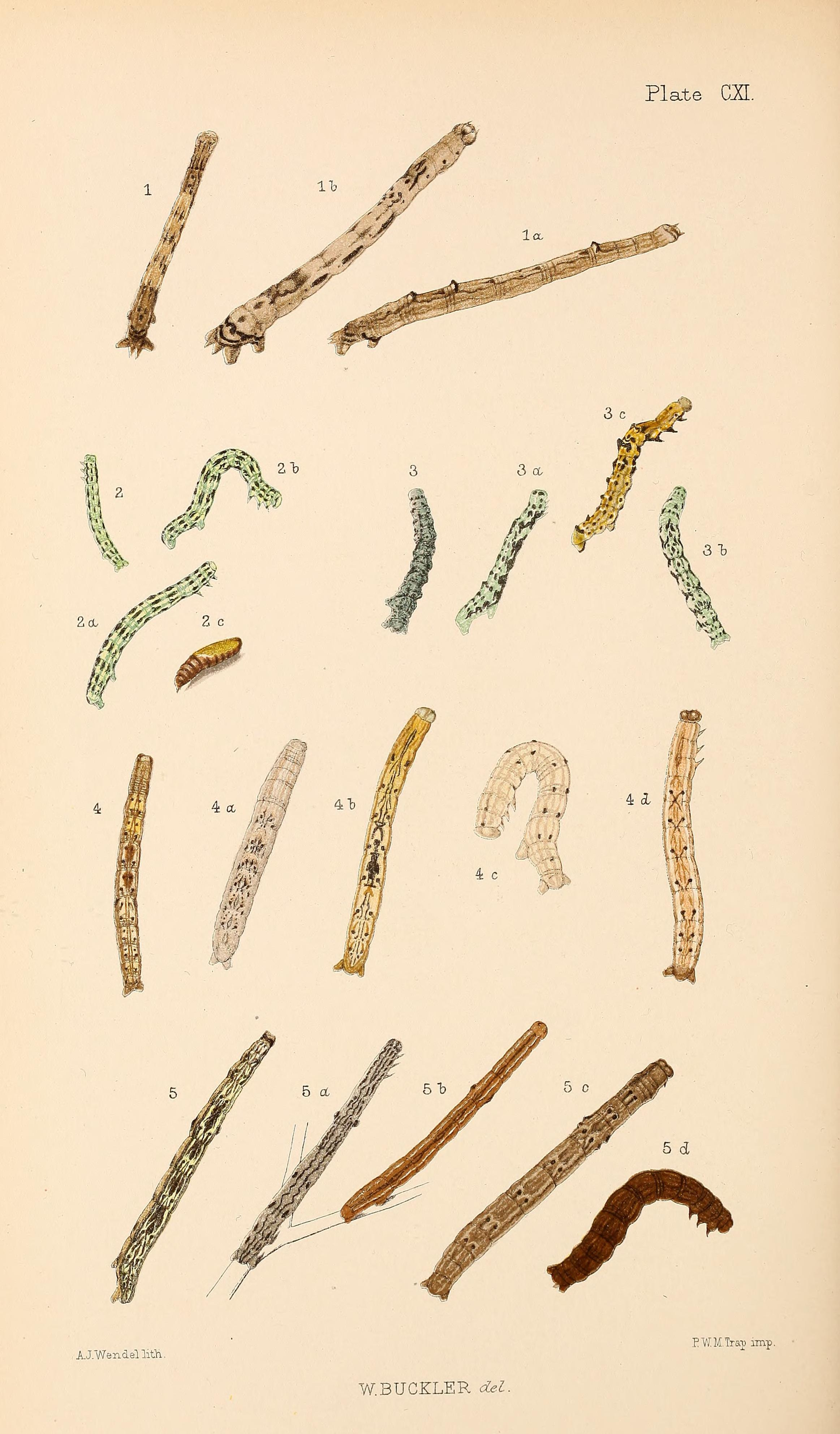
Figs. 1,1a,1b Larvae in various stages

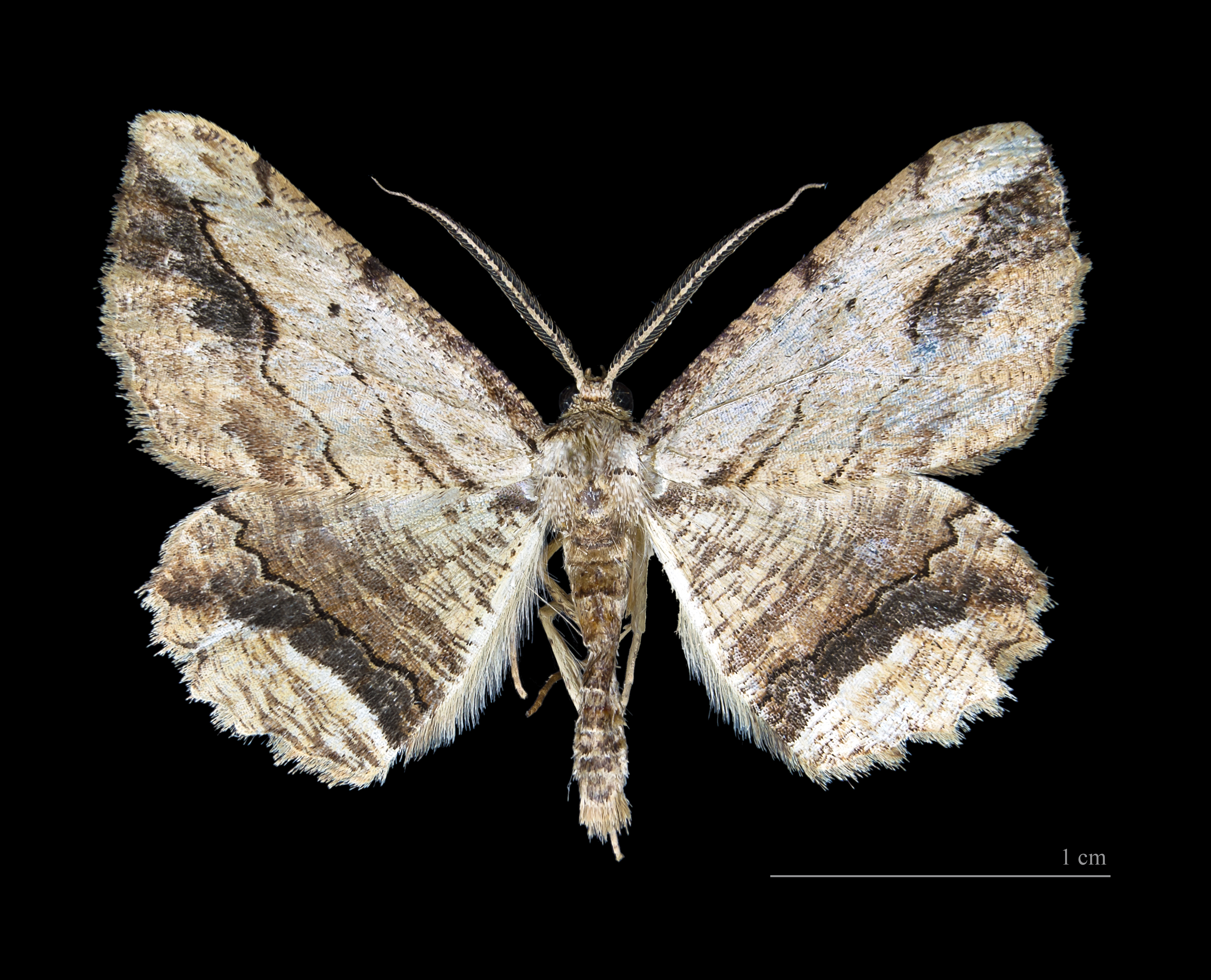
specimen, dorsal side

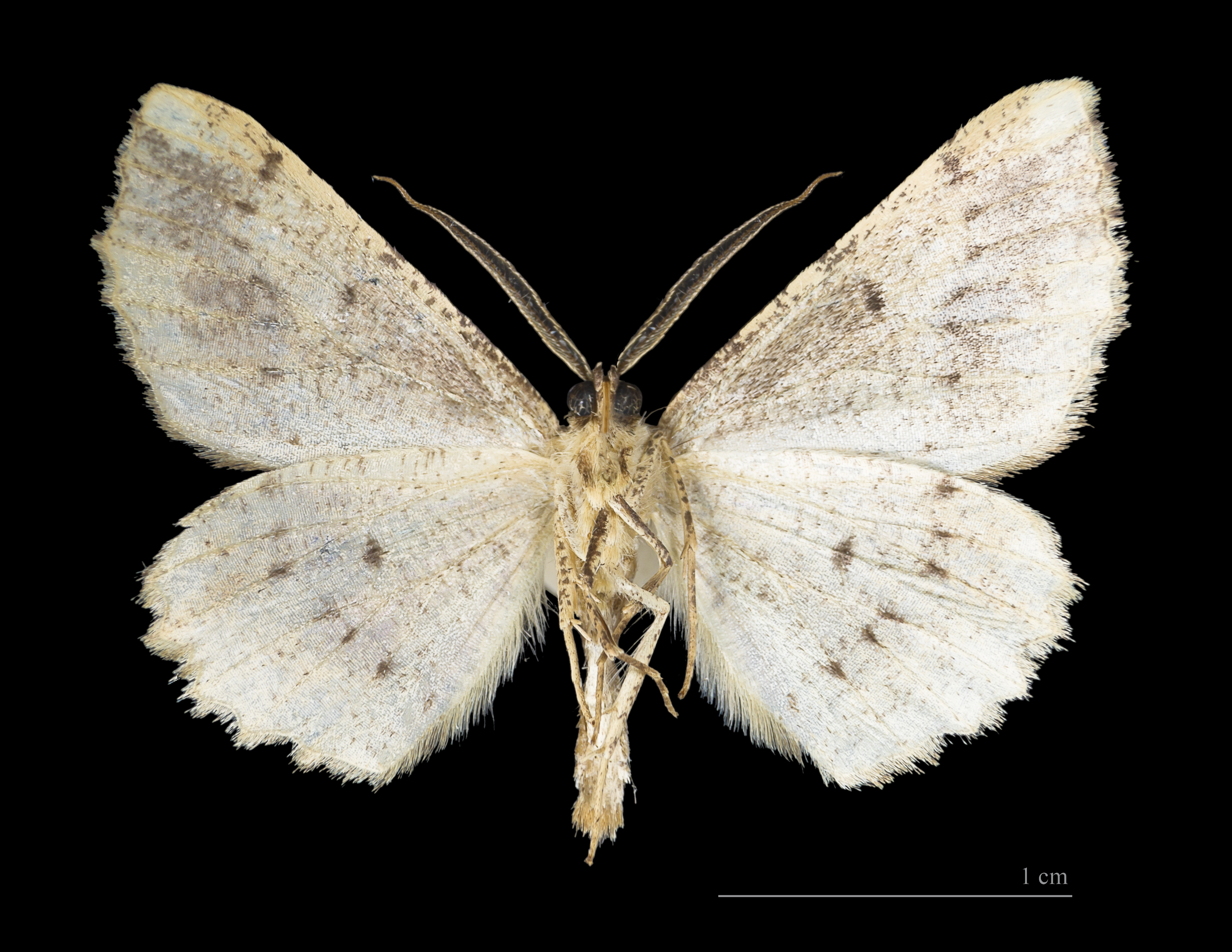
male specimen, ventral side

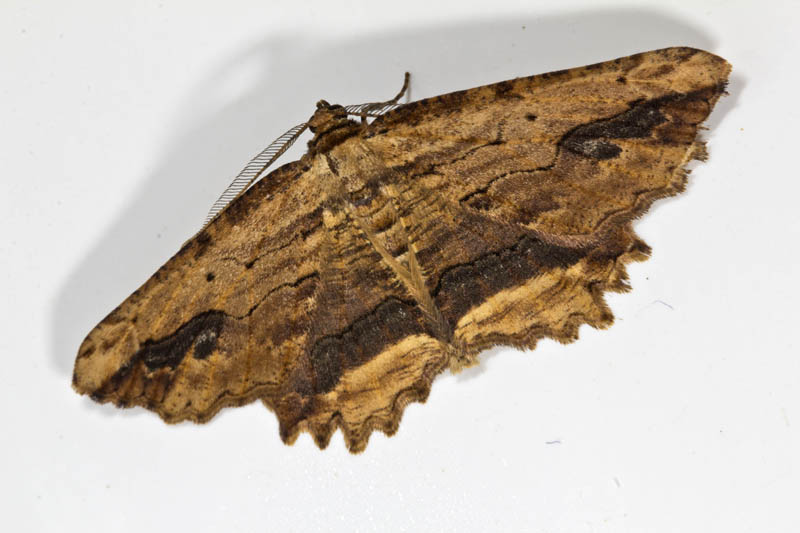
