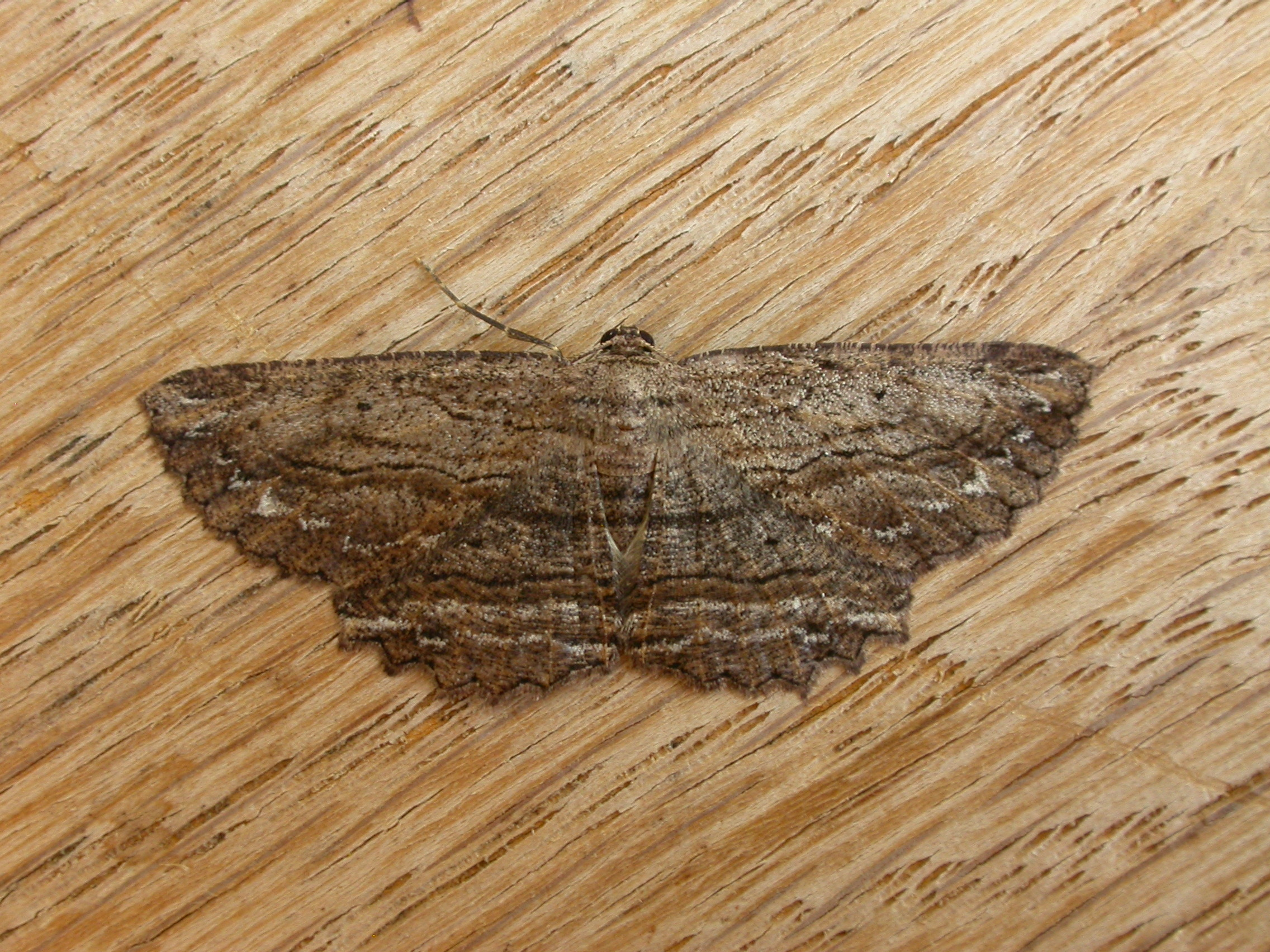

Scientific classification
- Kingdom: Animalia
- Phylum: Arthropoda
- Class: Insecta
- Order: Lepidoptera
- Family: Geometridae
- Genus: Selidosema
- Species: S. agoraea

Binomial name
- Selidosema agoraea Meyrick, 1892

= Selidosema agoraea =

Species of moth

Selidosema agoraea is a moth of the family Geometridae. It was first described by Edward Meyrick in 1892. It is known from Australia.
