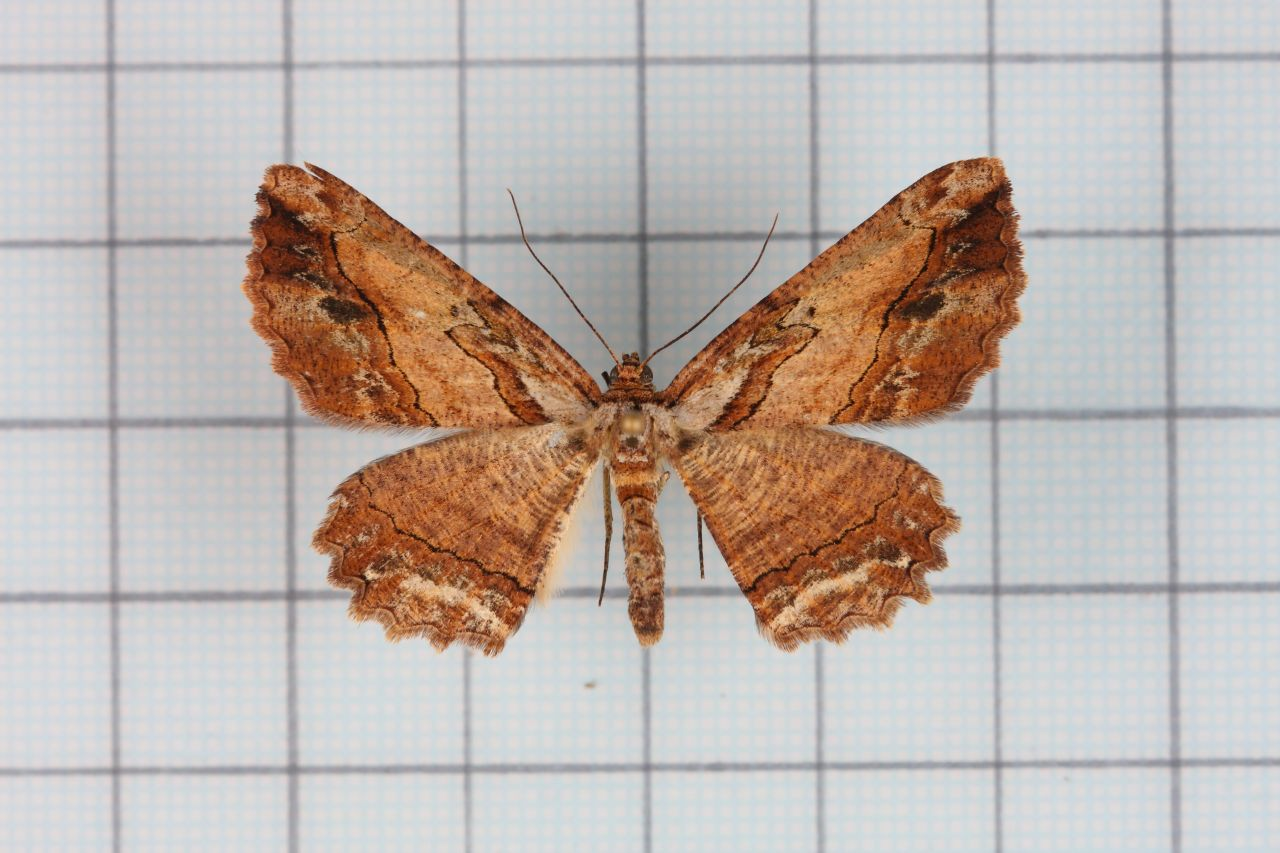

Scientific classification
- Domain: Eukaryota
- Kingdom: Animalia
- Phylum: Arthropoda
- Class: Insecta
- Order: Lepidoptera
- Family: Geometridae
- Genus: Menophra
- Species: M. nakajimai

Binomial name
- Menophra nakajimai Sato, 1984

= Menophra nakajimai =

Species of moth

Menophra nakajimai is a moth in the family Geometridae. It is found in Taiwan.
