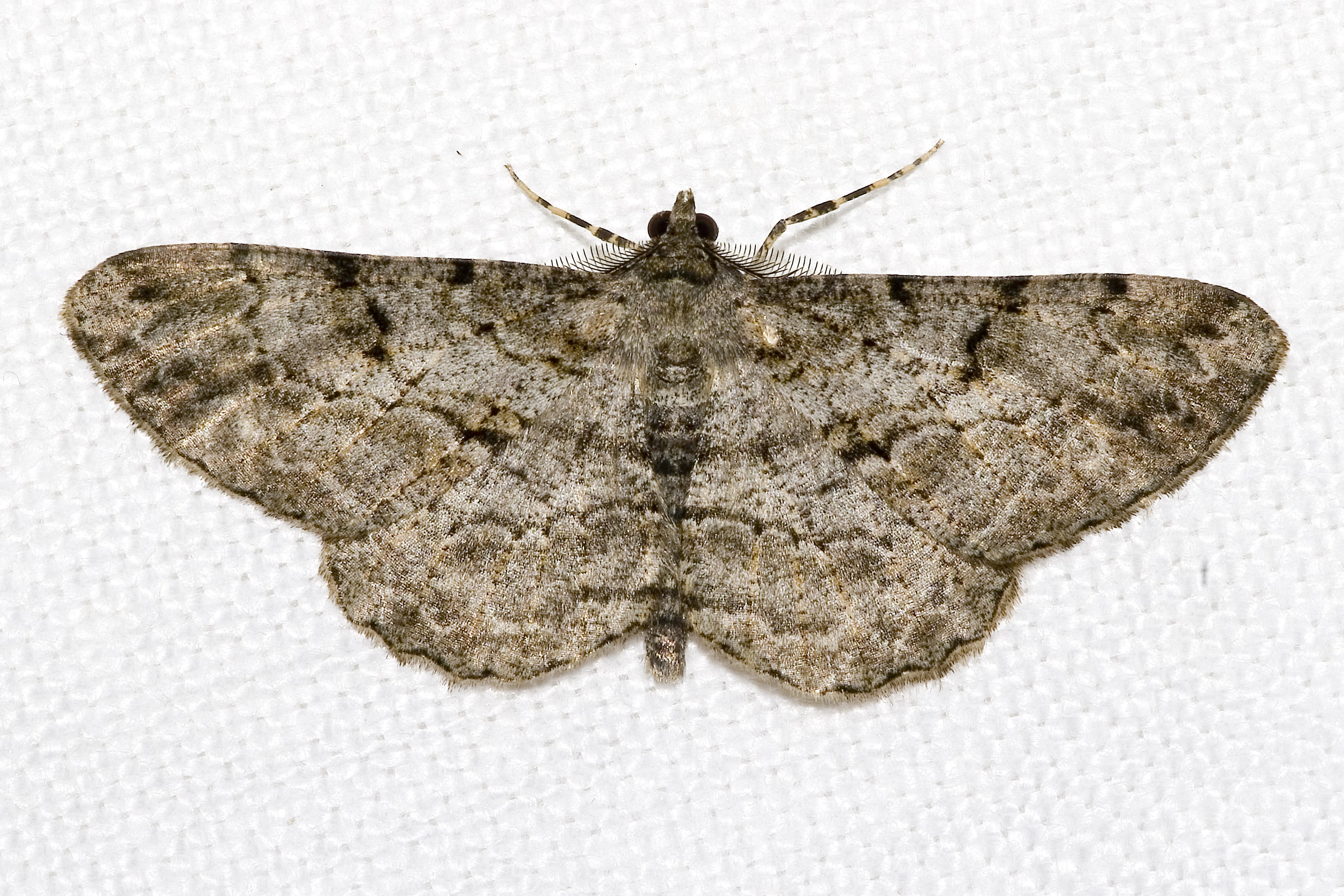
- Adult male from Dresden (Germany)

Scientific classification
- Kingdom: Animalia
- Phylum: Arthropoda
- Clade: Pancrustacea
- Class: Insecta
- Order: Lepidoptera
- Family: Geometridae
- Genus: Peribatodes
- Species: P. rhomboidaria

Binomial name
- Peribatodes rhomboidaria (Denis & Schiffermüller, 1775)

Synonyms
- Numerous, see text

= Willow beauty =

Species of moth

The willow beauty (Peribatodes rhomboidaria) is a moth of the family Geometridae. It is a common species of Europe and adjacent regions (Near East and the Maghreb). While it is found widely throughout Scandinavian countries, which have a maritime climate, it is absent from parts of the former USSR which are at the same latitude but have a more continental climate.

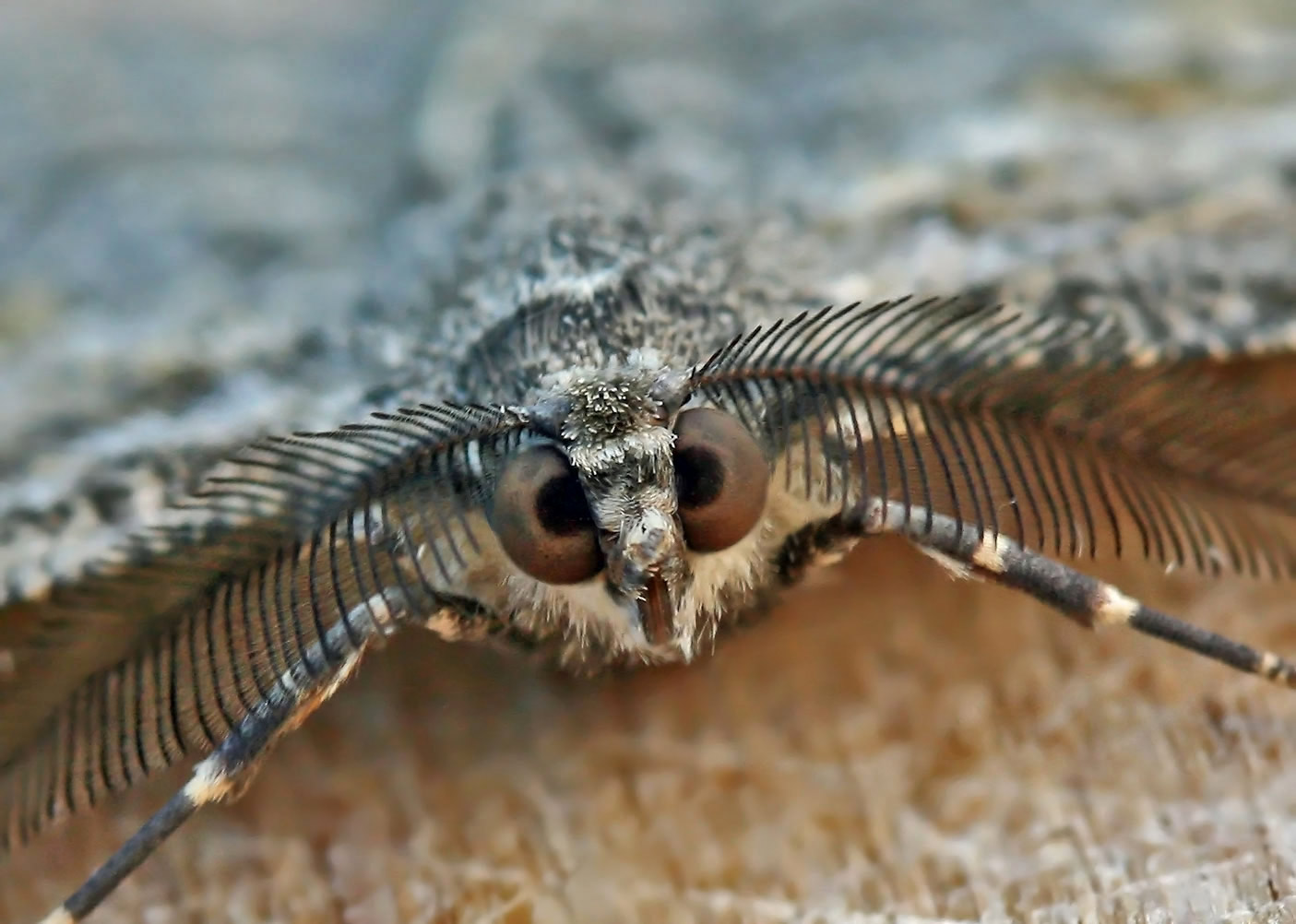
The head of a male Peribatodes rhomboidaria

Up to four subspecies are listed by some authors, while others consider the willow beauty a monotypic species or accept only rhomboidaria and sublutearia as distinct:

- Peribatodes rhomboidaria corsicaria (Schawerda 1931)
- Peribatodes rhomboidaria defloraria (Dannehl 1928)
- Peribatodes rhomboidaria rhomboidaria (Denis & Schiffermüller, 1775)
- Peribatodes rhomboidaria sublutearia (Zerny 1927)

Under its junior synonym Geometra rhomboidaria, the willow beauty is the type species of its genus Peribatodes. This was initially proposed as a subgenus of Boarmia but eventually elevated to full genus rank.

== Description and ecology ==
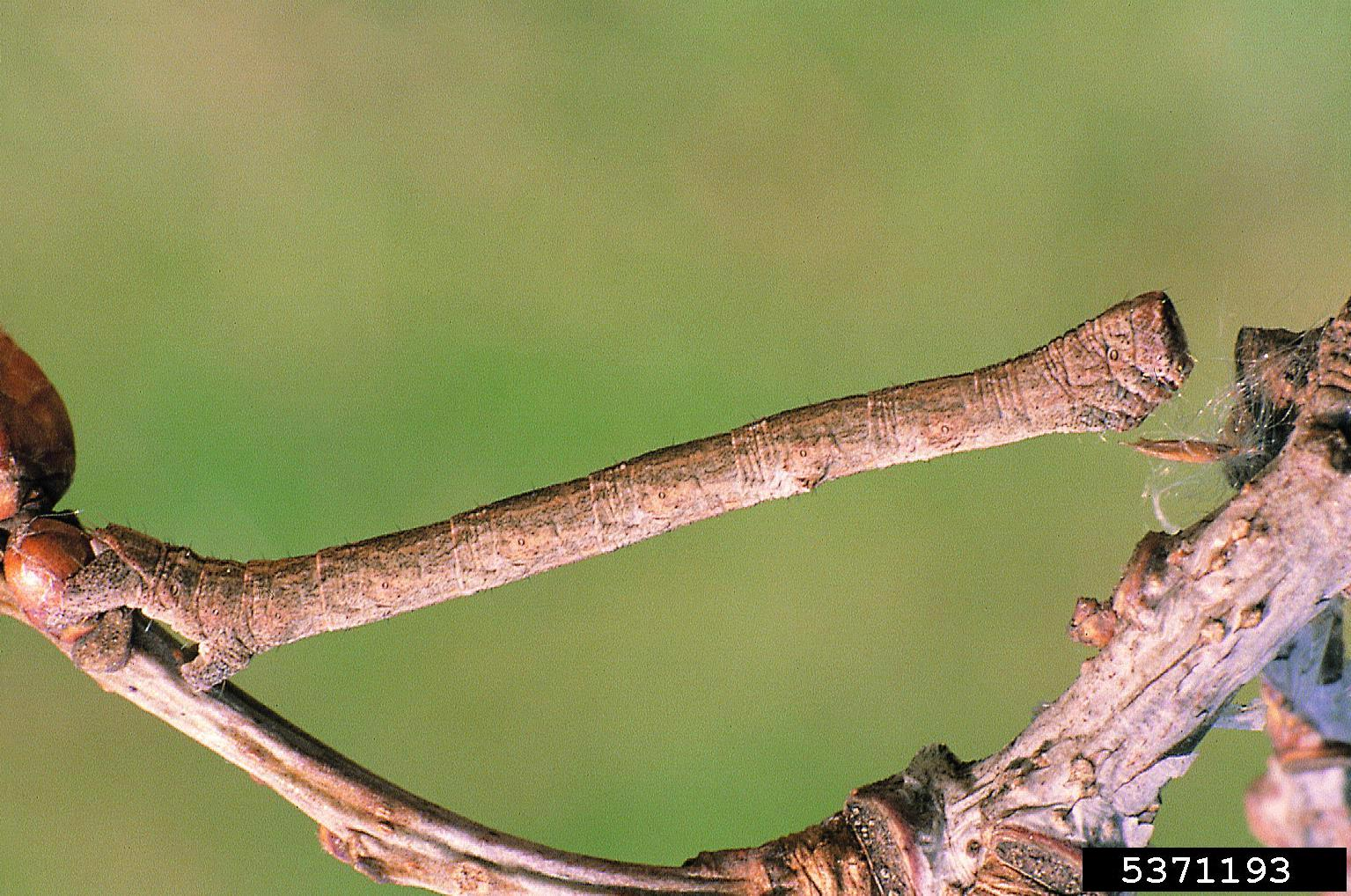
Caterpillar

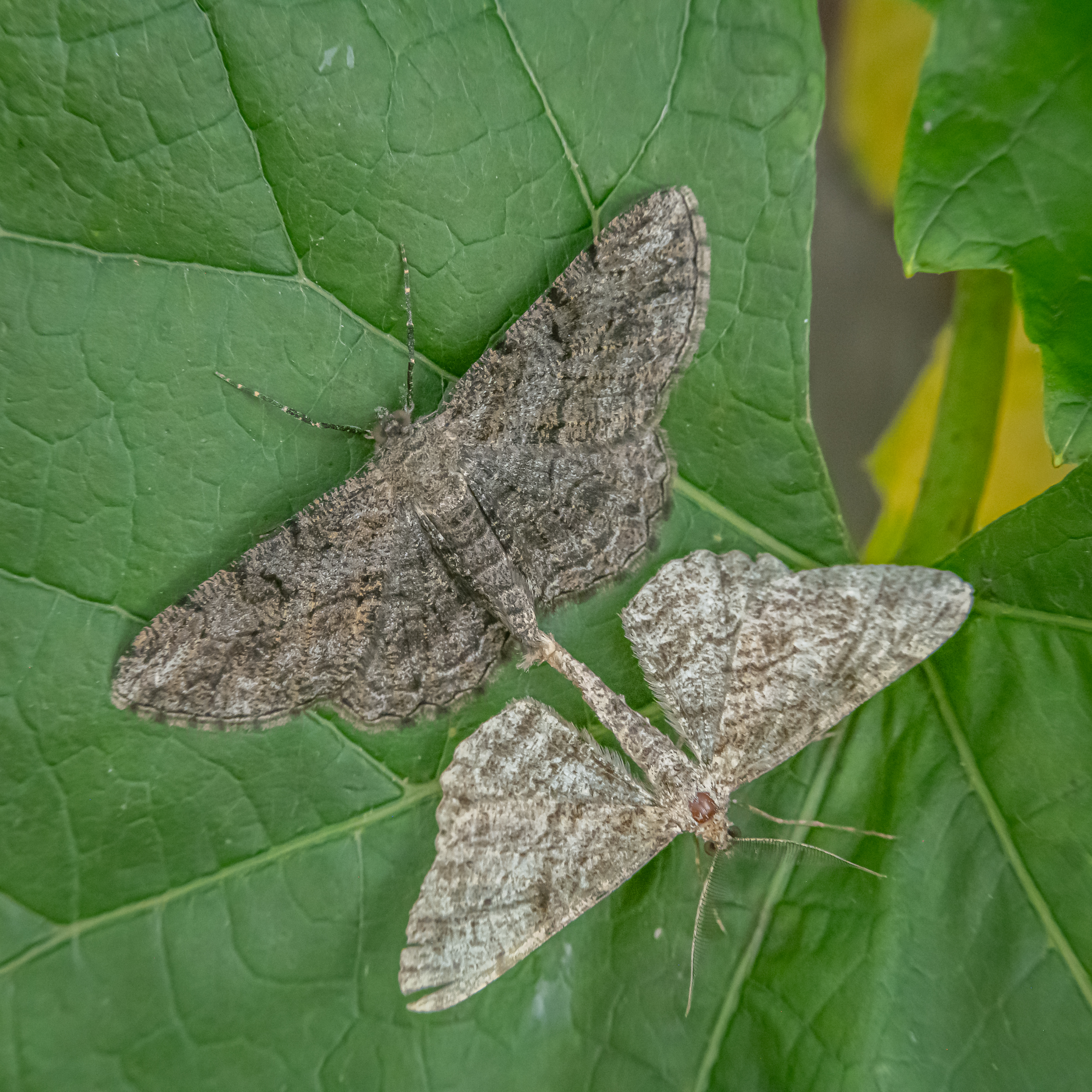
Copula

The adult's wingspan is 40–48 mm. The wings of this species are whitish-grey or -yellowish, though they have a buff or grey appearance from a distance, as they are heavily speckled with brown or black dots. Running over the fore- and hindwings in a semicircle are the two blackish bands commonly found in Ennominae, but they are broken and somewhat indistinct in this species. A tell-tale characteristic is a single bulge in the forewing part of the outer blackish bands. Melanic forms (e.g. rebeli) sometimes occur. The sexes can be distinguished by their antennae, which are strongly feathered in the male, but almost smooth in the female. See similar species (below)

This moth inhabits woodland, gardens and similar habitat. Either one or two generations occur each year, depending on locality. The adults are on the wing during summer – e.g. June to September on the British Isles, while in the more continental climate of Austria they are rarely seen anymore in late August. They fly at night and are attracted to light.

The caterpillar larva is reddish-brown and feeds on a variety of trees and shrubs, but – despite its name – rarely or never on willows (Salix). The species overwinters as a small larva. As evidenced by the species distribution, it does not seem to tolerate severe and dry winters very well.

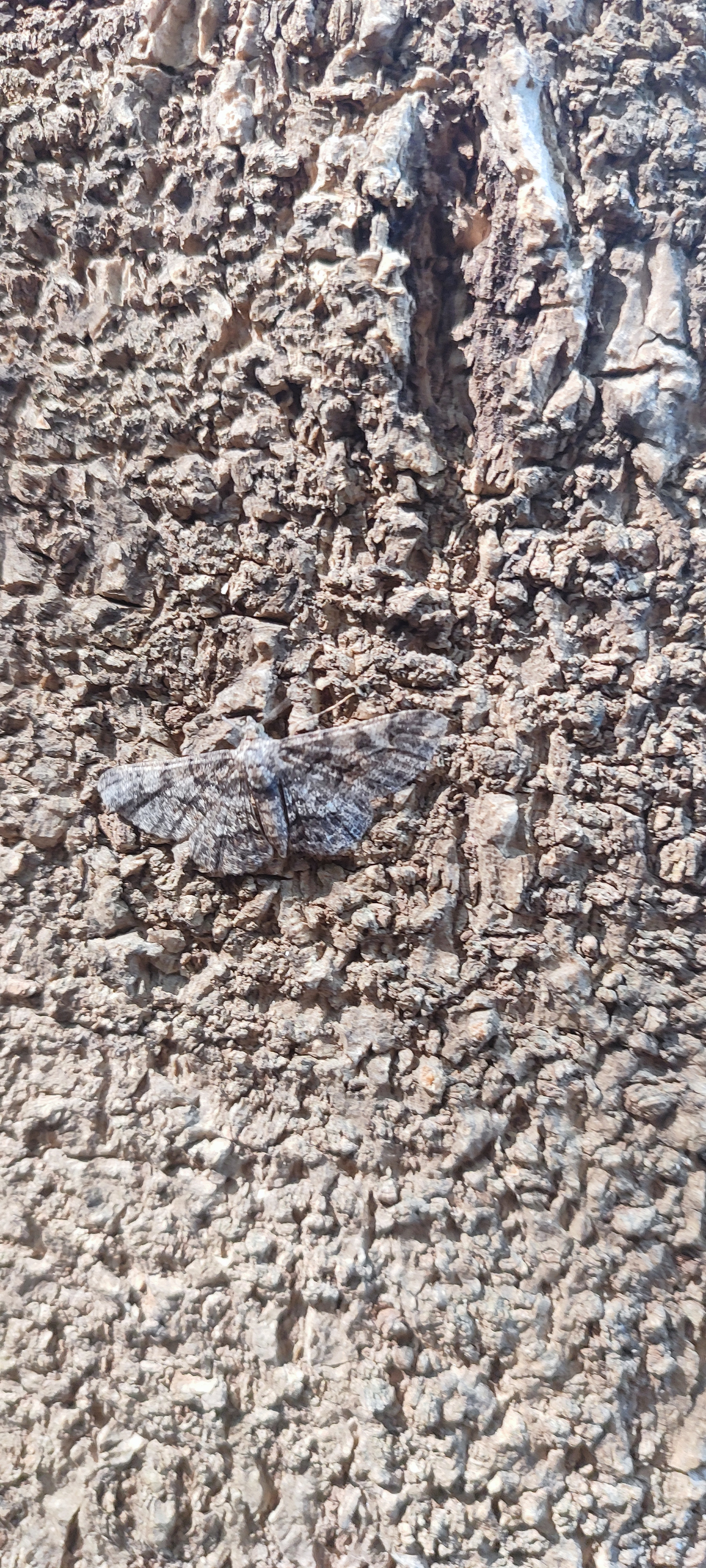
Willowbeauty on Tree

=== Recorded food plants ===
Willow beauty larvae are highly polyphagous and not adapted to a specific lineage of foodplants. Rather, they eat foliage of a wide range of eudicots, as well as some other plants. Recorded foodplants include:

- Betula (birch)
- Camellia sinensis (tea)
- Clematis (clematises) – not in Finland
- Crataegus (hawthorn)
- Hedera (ivy)
- Ligustrum (privet) – not in Finland
- Malus (apple)
- Prunus (plum, cherry, peach) – including blackthorn (P. spinosa) – not in Finland – and possibly others
- Taxus (yew)
- Vitis (grapevine)

== Synonyms ==
Junior synonyms of the willow beauty include:

- Geometra rhomboidaria Denis & Schiffermüller, 1775
- Boarmia corsicaria Schawerda, 1931
- Boarmia defloraria Dannehl, 1928
- Peribatodes dragone de Laever & Parenzan, 1986
- Boarmia psoralaria Millière, 1885
- Boarmia syritaurica Wehrli, 1931

== Similar species ==
Peribatodes rhomboidaria is difficult to certainly distinguish from its congeners. See Townsend et al.

- Peribatodes secundaria ([Denis & Schiffermüller], 1775)
- Peribatodes ilicaria (Geyer, 1833
- Deileptenia ribeata (Clerck, 1759)
- Alcis repandata (Linnaeus, 1758)
