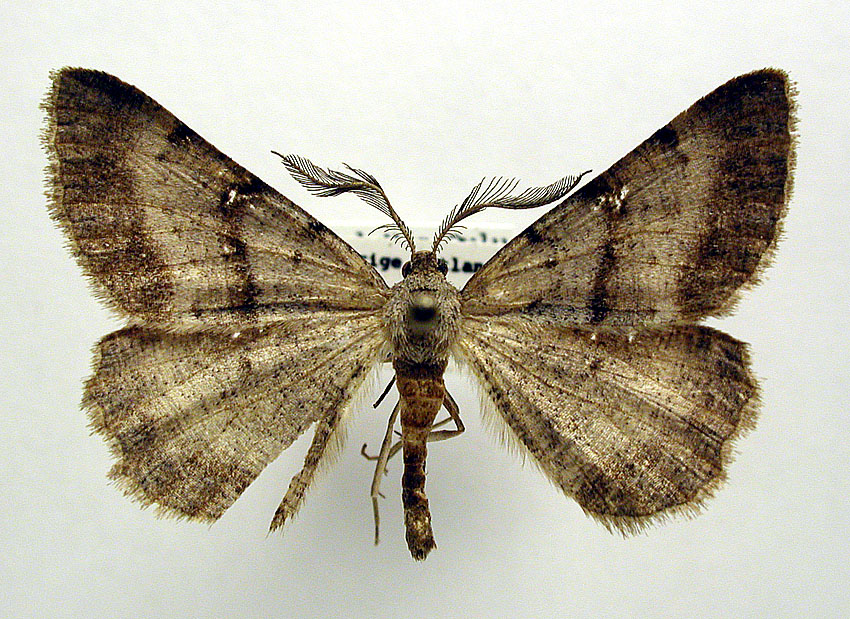
- Subspecies scandinaviaria

Scientific classification
- Domain: Eukaryota
- Kingdom: Animalia
- Phylum: Arthropoda
- Class: Insecta
- Order: Lepidoptera
- Family: Geometridae
- Genus: Selidosema
- Species: S. brunnearia

Binomial name
- Selidosema brunnearia (Devillers, 1789)

Synonyms
- Phalaena brunnearia Devillers, 1789; Selidosema dilucescens Wehrli, 1924; Selidosema oliveirata Mabille, 1876; Selidosema pallidaria Staudinger, 1901; Fidonia pyrenaearia Boisduval, 1840; Selidosema scandinaviaria Staudinger, 1901; Selidosema tyronensis Cockayne, 1948

= Selidosema brunnearia =

Species of moth

Selidosema brunnearia, the bordered grey, is a moth of the family Geometridae. The species was first described by Charles Joseph Devillers in 1789. It is found in central and southern Europe, Asia Minor, Transcaucasia and North Africa.

== Description ==
The wingspan is 37–43 mm. It is brown or purple brown with dark discal dots or spots, the lines and distal band usually indicated on the forewing, but very variably, the lines wanting on the hindwing. Female much smaller-winged than male, with stout abdomen, moderately well marked. - pyrenaearia Boisduval, 1840 has a very strongly expressed dark median line but the dark marginal band obsolescent. Pyrenees and Spain. - pallidaria Staudinger, 1901 is a very weakly marked, cinereous whitish form from Sicily, Dalmatia, etc.- syriacaria Staudinger shows a similar pale ground colour but the discal spots, median line of forewing and submarginal bands are well developed. Syria. - scandinaviaria Stgr. is dark violet-grey, the median line present, the distal bands broad. Scandinavia. -oelandica Wahlgren is a modification of the preceding, perhaps less dark grey, with an additional dark band occupying the entire space between median and postmedian lines, which are both black. Oeland. Perhaps not separable from the following. - oliveirata Mabille, 1876 is similar to scandinaviaria but with a broad fuscous median band on the forewing. Portugal. - granataria Ebr. seems to be also an aberration of plumaria, with the median shade of the forewing composed of three spots, the pale subterminal line (band) unusually distinct. Andalusia.

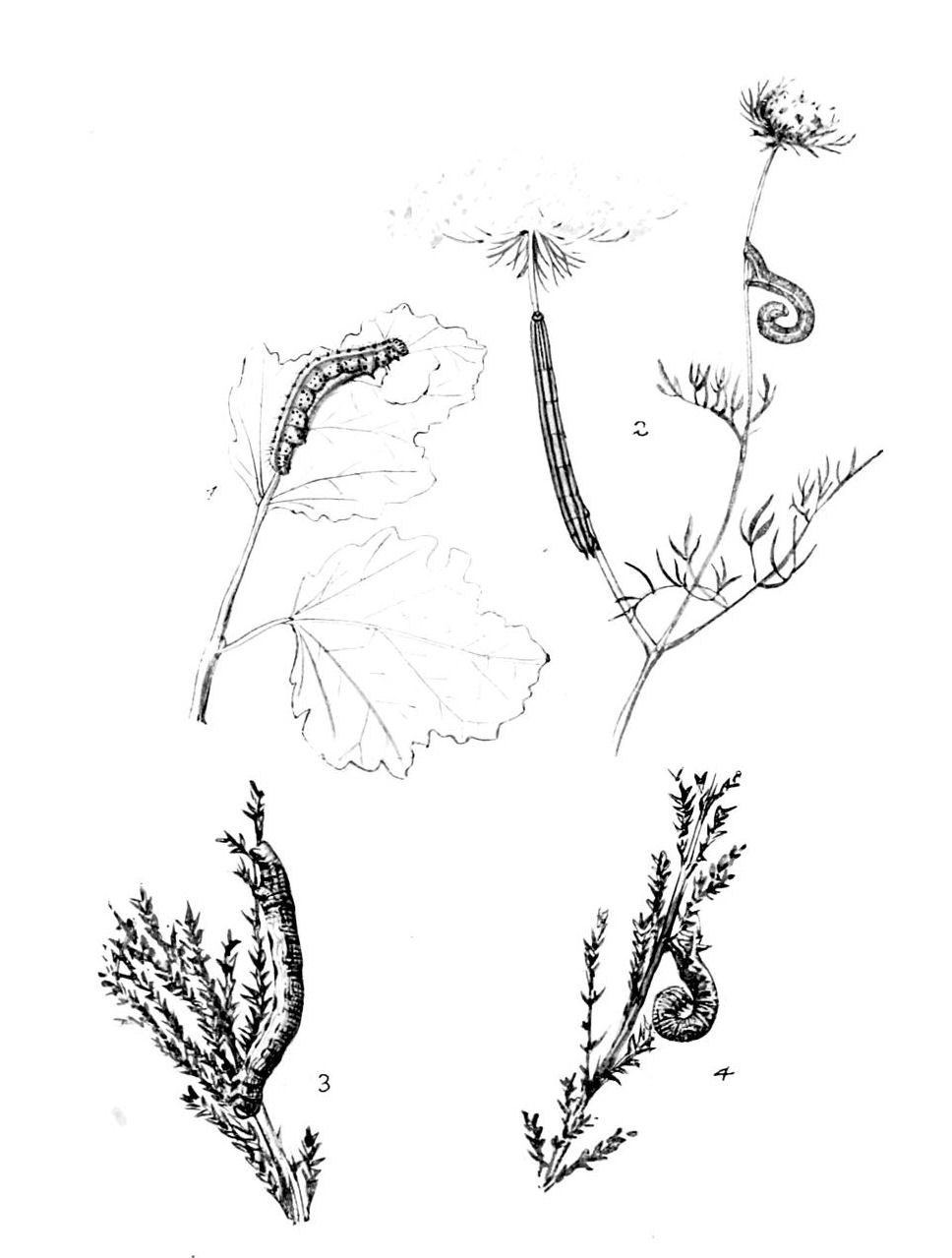
larva figure 3

The larva is naked, light yellow-brown with narrow, light longitudinal stripes and scattered, round dark spots.

== Biology ==
There is one generation per year with adults on wing from July to August. The habitat consists of heath, dunes and calcareous grassland. The larvae feed on Calluna vulgaris, Cytisus scoparius, Rumex and Lotus species. The larvae can be found from September to July. It overwinters in the larval stage.

== Subspecies ==
The following subspecies are known:

- Selidosema brunnearia brunnearia
- Selidosema brunnearia dilucescens Wehrli, 1924
- Selidosema brunnearia oliveirata Mabille, 1876
- Selidosema brunnearia pallidaria Staudinger, 1901
- Selidosema brunnearia pyrenaearia (Boisduval, 1840)
- Selidosema brunnearia scandinaviaria Staudinger, 1901
- Selidosema brunnearia tyronensis Cockayne, 1948
