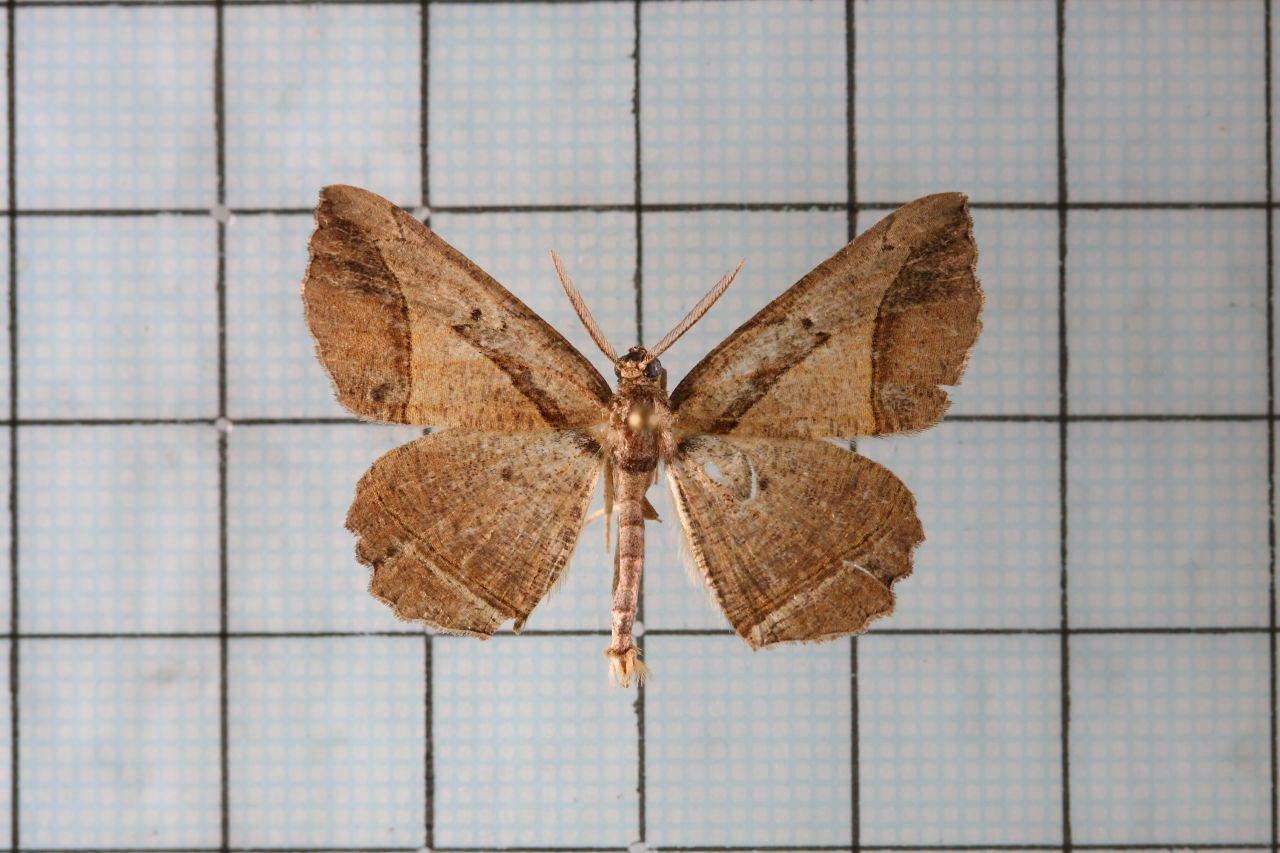

Scientific classification
- Kingdom: Animalia
- Phylum: Arthropoda
- Class: Insecta
- Order: Lepidoptera
- Family: Geometridae
- Genus: Menophra
- Species: M. taiwana

Binomial name
- Menophra taiwana Wileman, 1910

Synonyms
- Ephemerophila taiwana

= Menophra taiwana =

Species of moth

Menophra taiwana is a moth of the family Geometridae. It is endemic to Taiwan.
