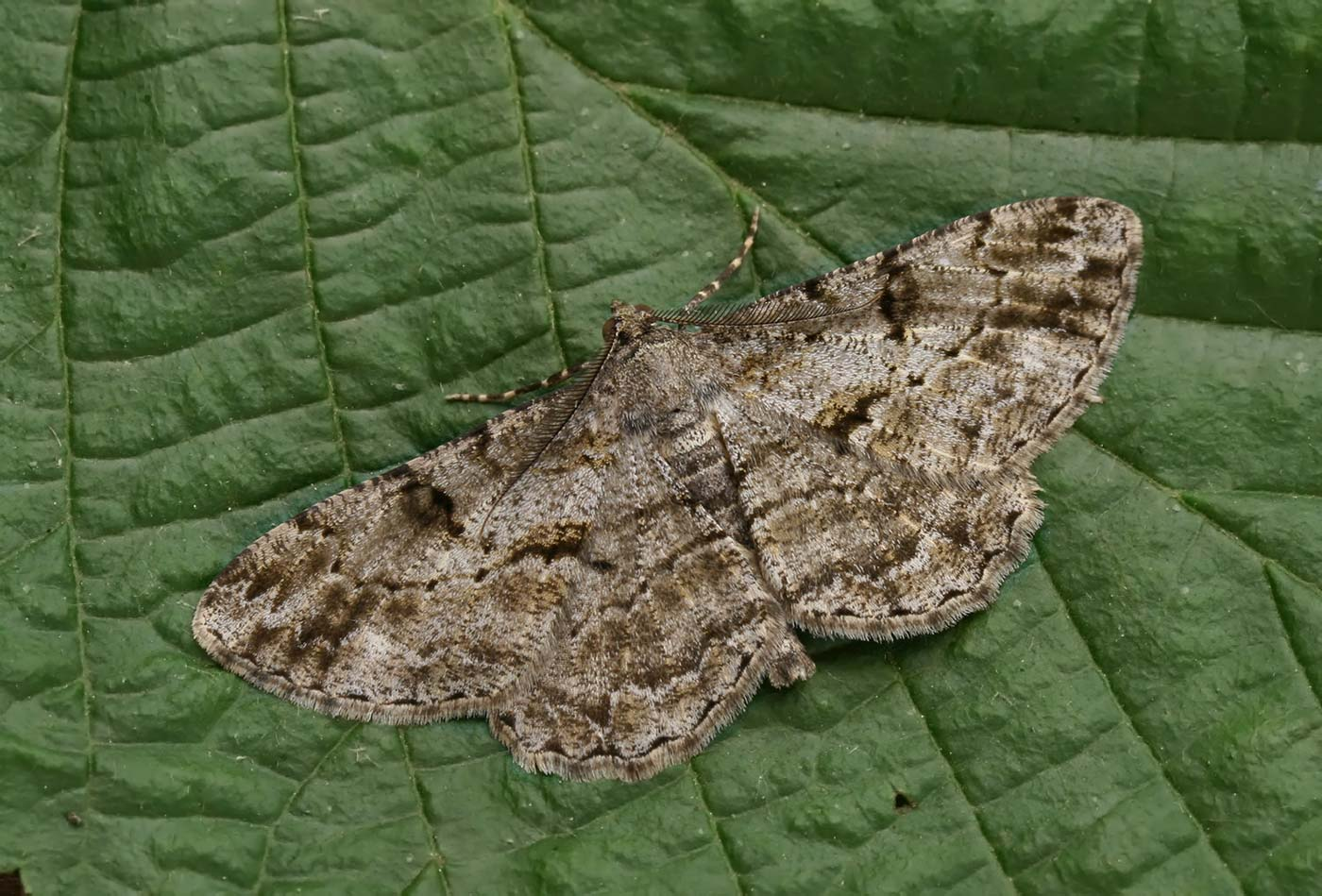
- Male Peribatodes rhomboidaria

Scientific classification
- Domain: Eukaryota
- Kingdom: Animalia
- Phylum: Arthropoda
- Class: Insecta
- Order: Lepidoptera
- Family: Geometridae
- Tribe: Boarmiini
- Genus: Peribatodes; Wehrli, 1943

Species
- see text

= Peribatodes =

Genus of moths

Peribatodes is a genus of moths in the family Geometridae. The genus was described by Wehrli in 1943.

In 1999, about 13 species were included in the genus.

Species include:

- Peribatodes ilicaria (Geyer, 1833) – Lydd beauty
- Peribatodes rhomboidaria (Denis & Schiffermüller, 1775) – willow beauty
- Peribatodes secundaria (Denis & Schiffermüller, 1775) – feathered beauty
- Peribatodes umbraria (Hübner, 1809) – olive-tree beauty
