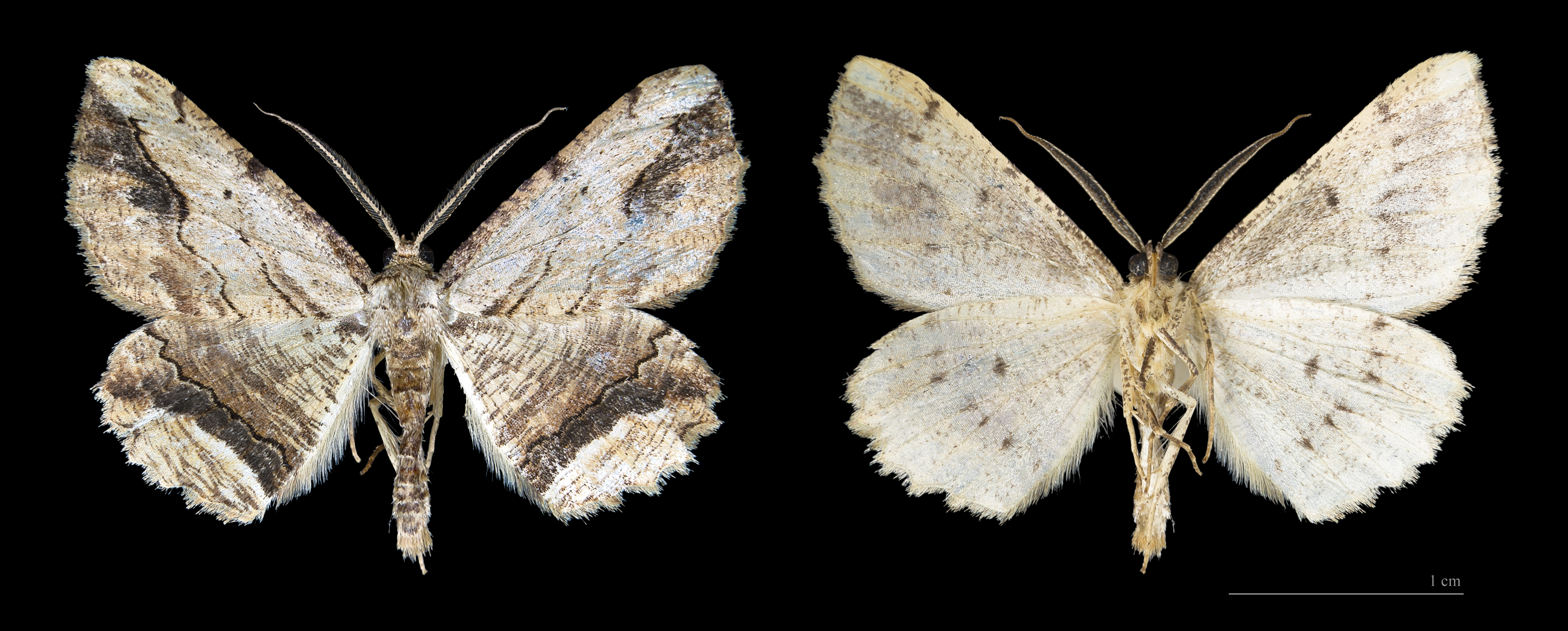
- Both side of a male Menophra abruptaria

Scientific classification
- Kingdom: Animalia
- Phylum: Arthropoda
- Class: Insecta
- Order: Lepidoptera
- Family: Geometridae
- Tribe: Boarmiini
- Genus: Menophra; Moore, 1887

Synonyms
- Hemerophila Stephens, 1829; Ceruncina Wehrli, 1941; Malacuncina Wehrli, 1941

= Menophra =

Genus of moths

Menophra is a genus of moths in the family Geometridae erected by Frederic Moore in 1887.

== Species ==
- Menophra aborta (Warren, 1898)
- Menophra abruptaria (Thunberg, 1792)
- Menophra anaplagiata Sato, 1984
- Menophra contenta (Prout, 1915)
- Menophra dnophera (Prout, 1915)
- Menophra grummi (Alphéraky, 1888)
- Menophra harterti (Rothschild, 1912)
- Menophra humeraria (Moore, 1868)
- Menophra japygiaria (O. Costa, 1849)
- Menophra lignata (Warren, 1894)
- Menophra mitsundoi Sato, 1984
- Menophra nakajimai Sato, 1984
- Menophra nycthemeraria (Geyer, 1831)
- Menophra praestantaria (Püngeler, 1902)
- Menophra retractaria (Moore, 1868)
- Menophra senilis (Butler, 1878)
- Menophra taiwana (Wileman, 1910)
- Menophra trypanaria (Wiltshire, 1948)
