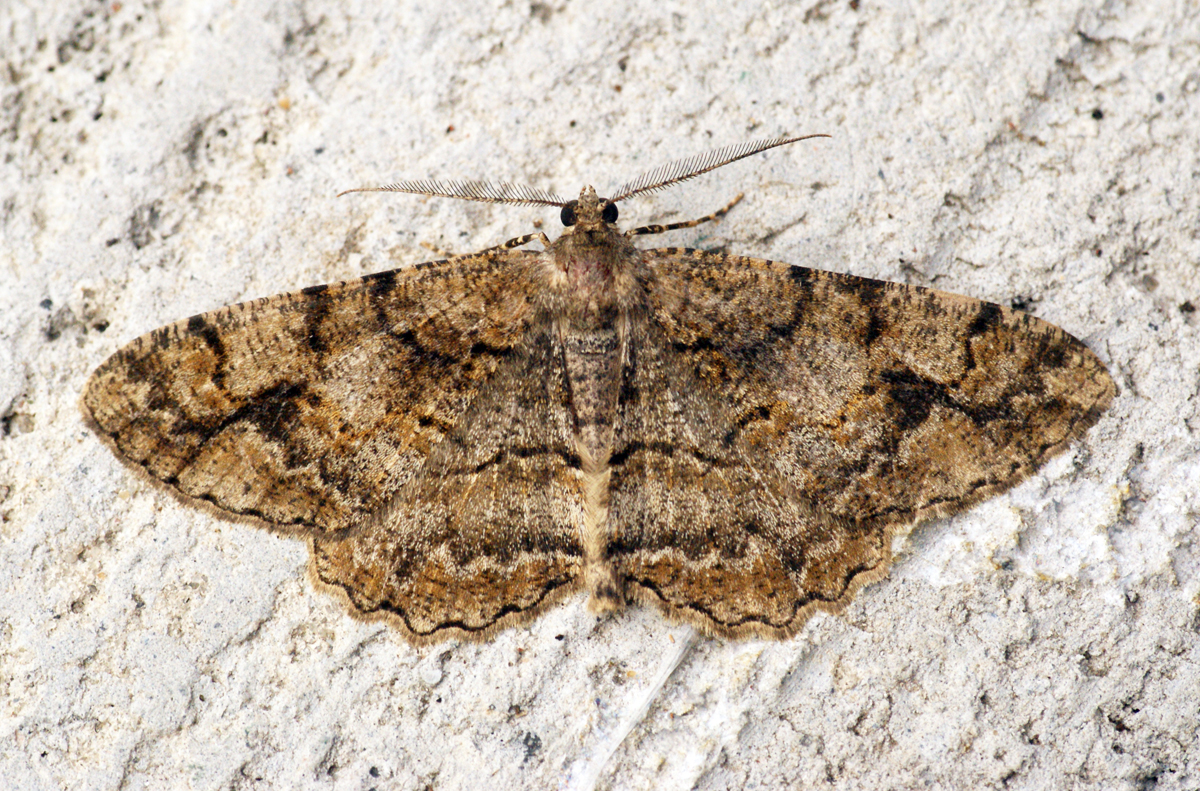

Scientific classification
- Kingdom: Animalia
- Phylum: Arthropoda
- Clade: Pancrustacea
- Class: Insecta
- Order: Lepidoptera
- Family: Geometridae
- Subfamily: Ennominae
- Tribe: Boarmiini
- Genus: Alcis
- Species: A. repandata

Binomial name
- Alcis repandata (Linnaeus, 1758)

Synonyms
- Phalaena repandata Linnaeus, 1758; Alcis repandatus; Boarmia repandata

= Mottled beauty =

Species of moth

The mottled beauty (Alcis repandata) is a moth of the family Geometridae. The species was first described by Carl Linnaeus in his 1758 10th edition of Systema Naturae.

== Subspecies and forms ==
Subspecies and forms include:

- Alcis repandata muraria
- Alcis repandata repandata
- Alcis repandata sodorensium
- Alcis repandata f. conversaria
- Alcis repandata f. nigricata

== Distribution ==
Alcis repandata is a common species of Europe and the Near East, extending throughout Europe to the Urals, in the south over the Mediterranean, Asia Minor, the Caucasus to Kazakhstan and in the north to the Arctic Circle.

== Habitat ==
The species inhabits deciduous, mixed and coniferous forests, bushy heaths, meadows, marshes and settlement areas. In the Alps occurs up to 1800 meters.

== Description ==
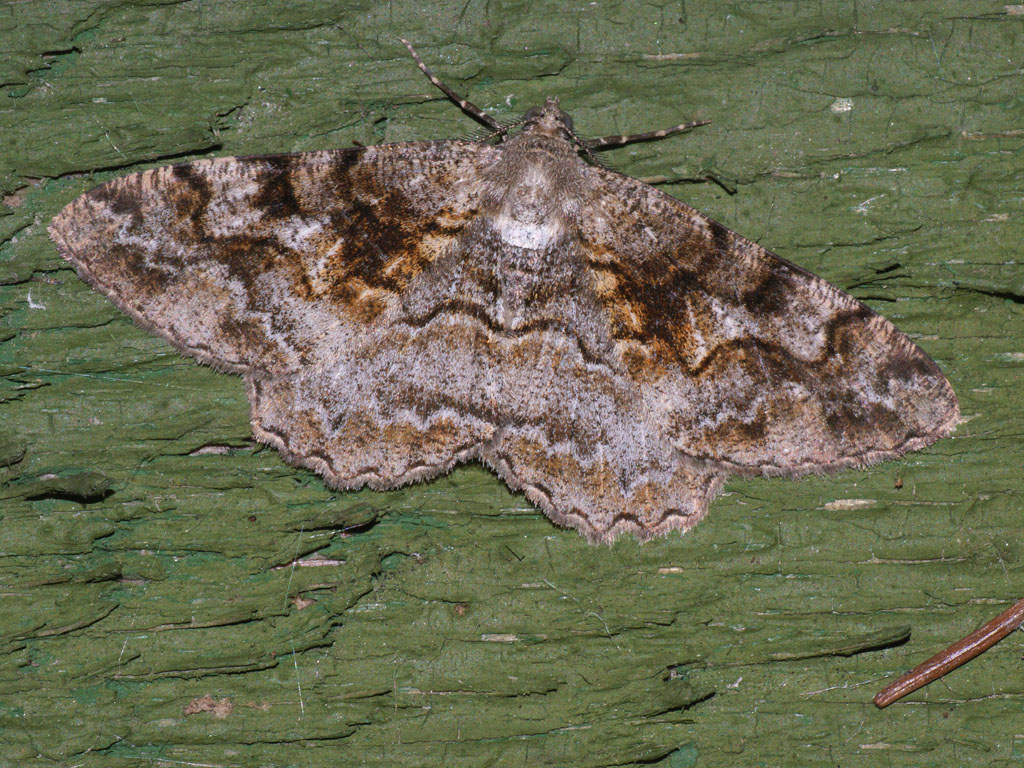
Adult moth

Alcis repandata has a wingspan reaching 30–45 mm. This is an extremely variable species, typically being buff or grey with black bars along the costa, but often with a broad blackish band across the forewings. Meyrick describes it - The head is grey mixed with whitish and fuscous. The forewings are light ochreous-brown, sprinkled with black and sometimes with whitish. The first line is curved, the median line is twice sinuate and dark fuscous, sometimes partly confluent. The second line is dark fuscous, roundly projecting above and below the middle. The subterminal is waved and pale or whitish, partially dark-margined. There is a blackish discal spot before the median. The hindwings are as the forewings, but the lines are less marked and regular. There is a discal dot beyond median. Melanic forms are also common, especially in industrial areas. In all but the darkest variations the most characteristic feature is a pale zigzag line across the hindwing. The larva is pale greenish-ochreous, brown-marked, sometimes suffused with dark grey, dusted with yellow. The dorsal line is brown or dark grey, distinct on segments 2–4, often obsolete elsewhere. Segments 5-12 sometimes have pale dorsal diamonds. See also Prout (1912–16)

This species is rather similar to Willow Beauty (Peribatodes rhomboidaria) and its congeners. See Townsend et al.

== Biology ==
This moth flies at night in June and July in the British Isles. It is attracted to light.

The larva feeds on the leaves and soft bark of a wide range of trees and other plants (see list below).

The species overwinters as a small larva.

=== Recorded food plants ===
Host plants include:

- Alnus – alder
- Betula – birch
- Calluna – heather
- Crataegus – hawthorn
- Cytisus – broom
- Filipendula – meadowsweet
- Ligustrum – privet
- Lonicera – honeysuckle
- Quercus – oak
- Rhododendron
- Ribes – currant
- Rubus – bramble
- Rumex – dock
- Salix – willow
- Sorbus – rowan
- Tilia – lime
- Vaccinium

== Subspecies ==
- Alcis jubata jubata

== Gallery ==
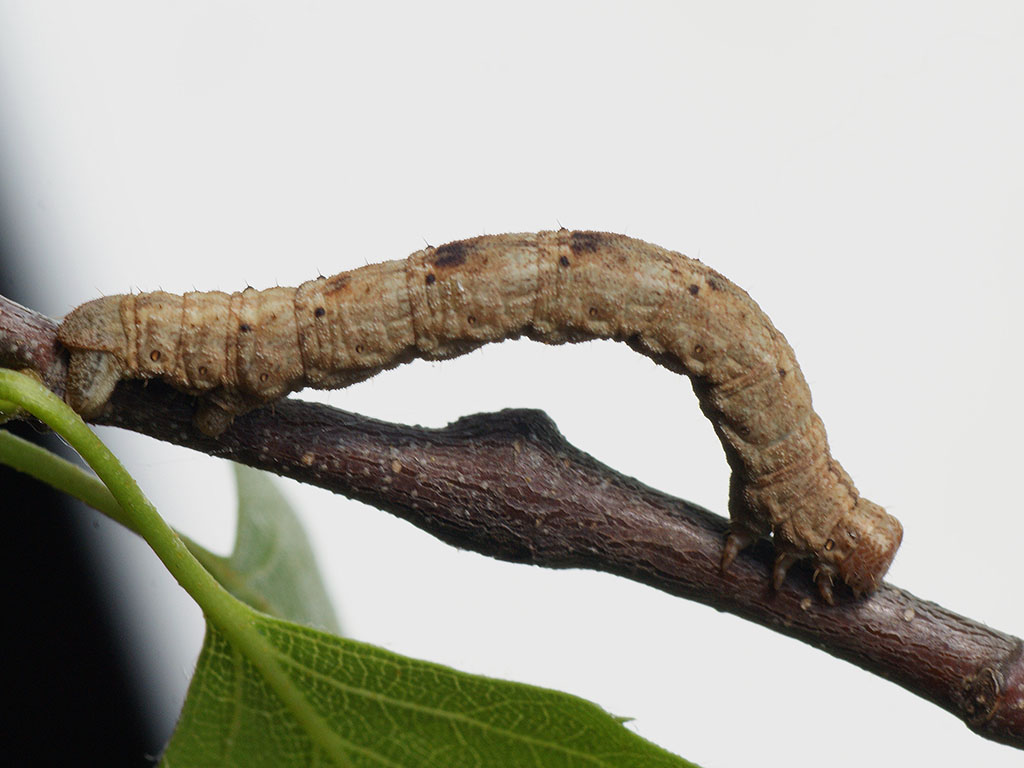
Caterpillar

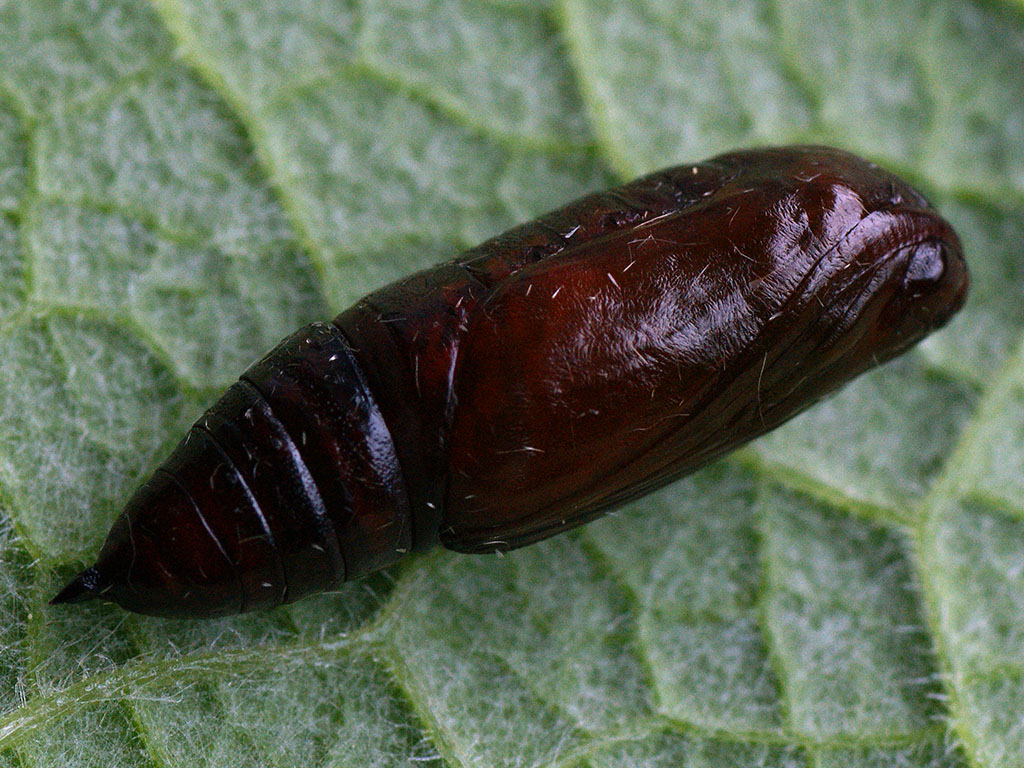
Chrysalis

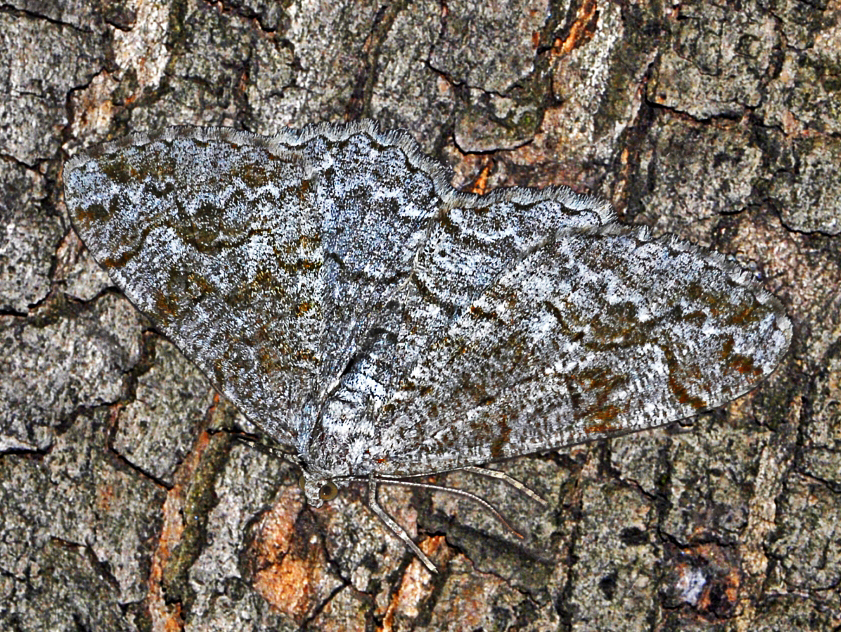
Imago

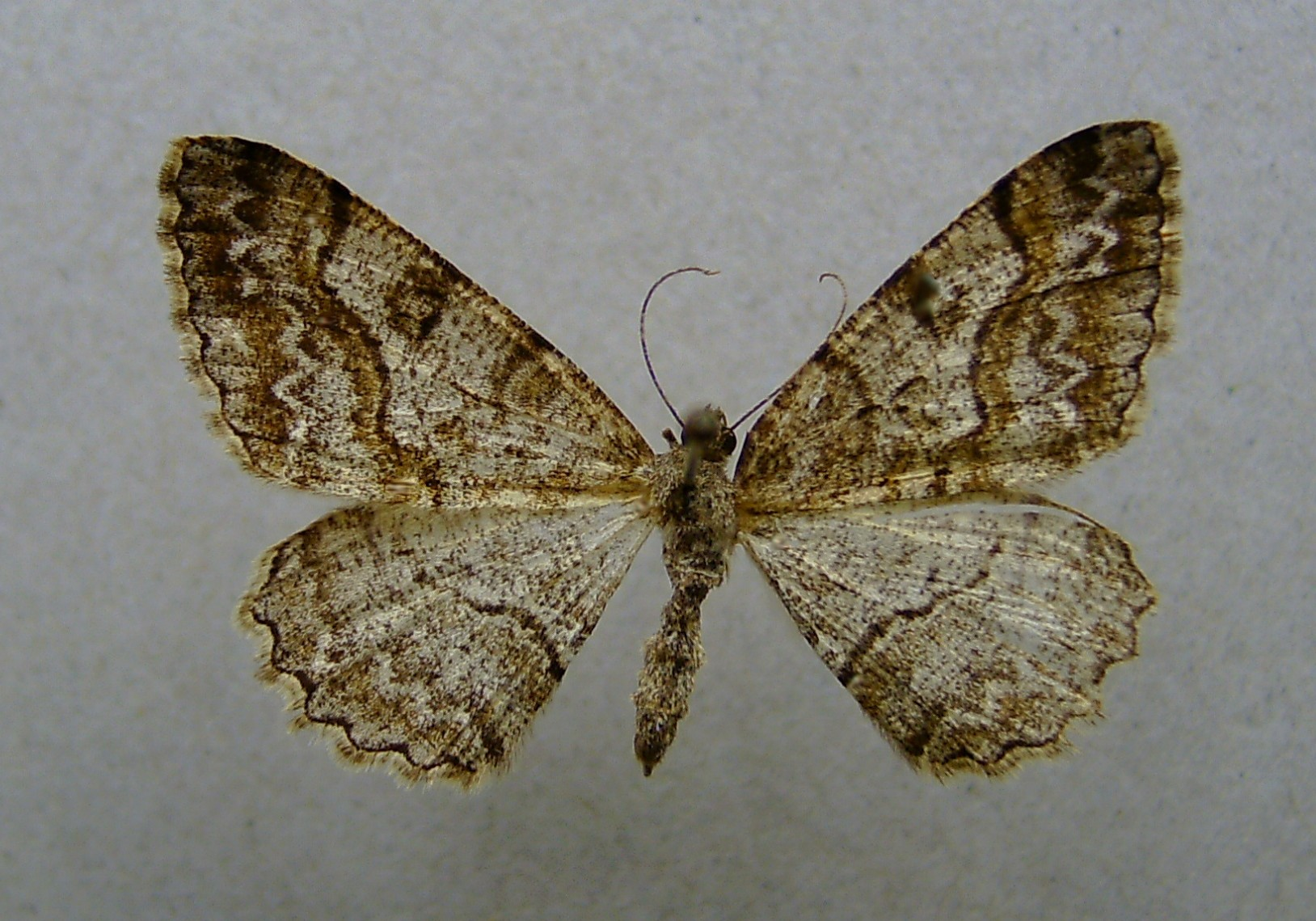
Mounted specimen

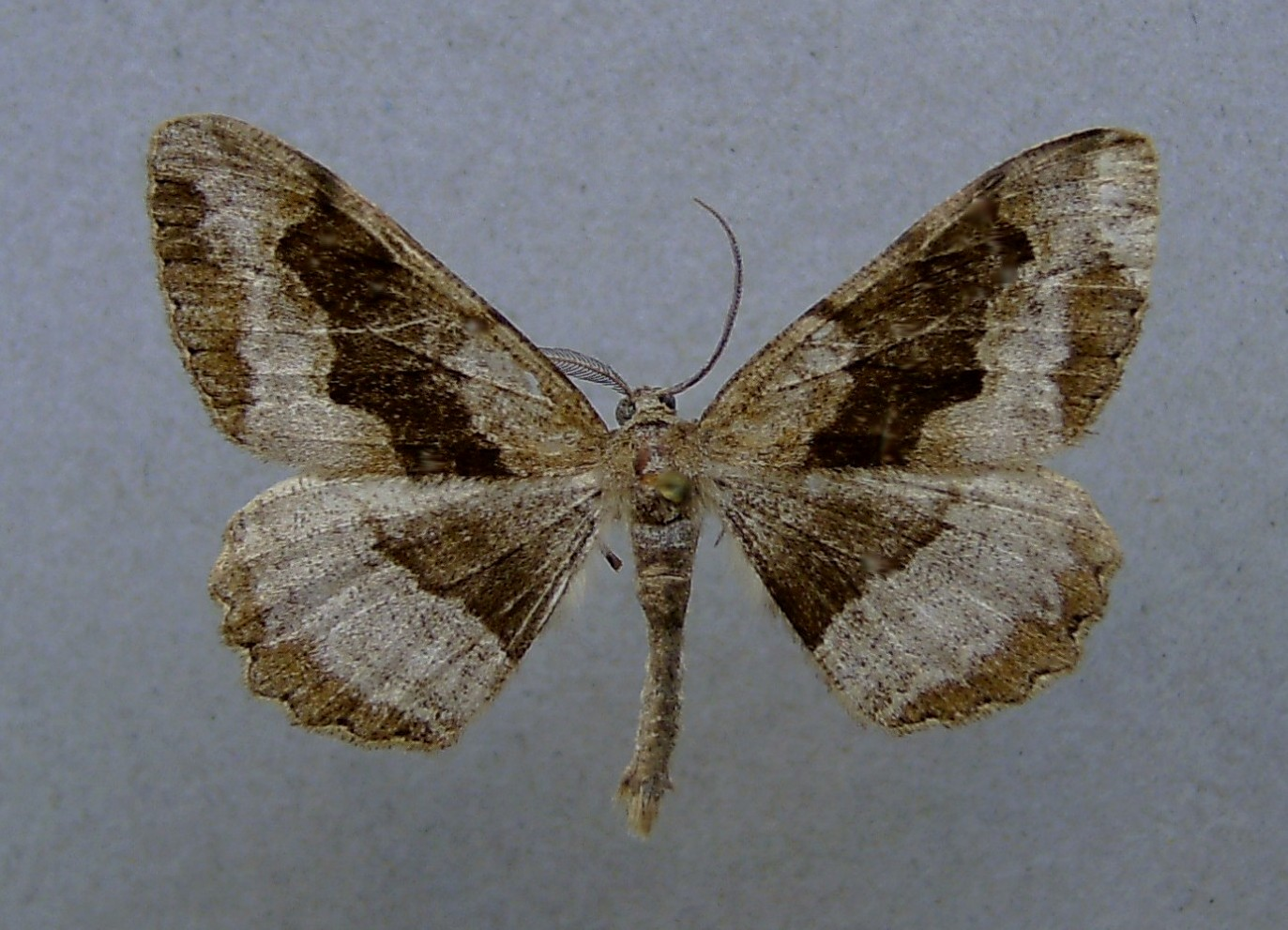
Male Alcis repandata f. conversaria
